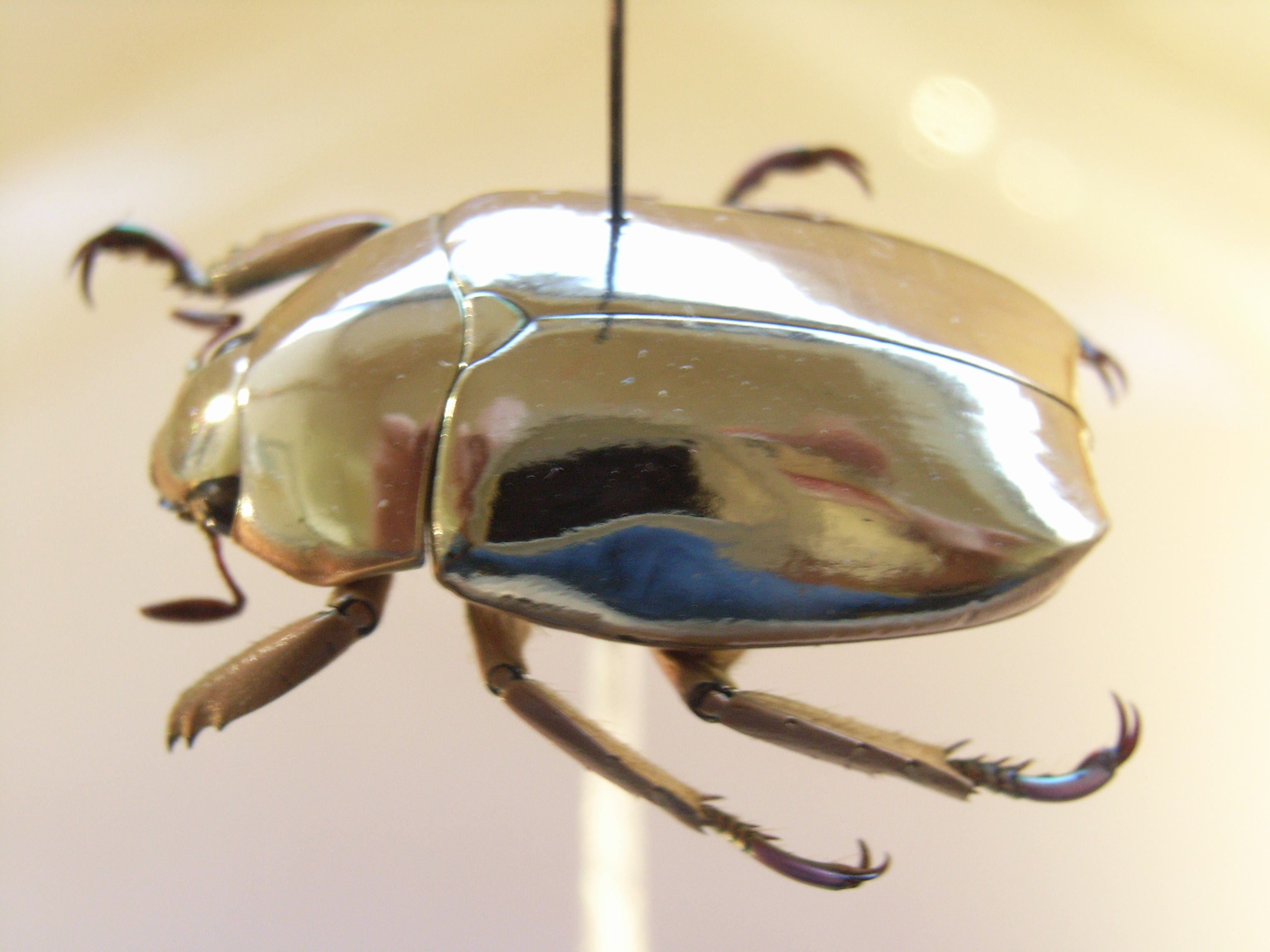
- Chrysina sp. Ex coll. Felix Stumpe

Scientific classification
- Kingdom: Animalia
- Phylum: Arthropoda
- Clade: Pancrustacea
- Class: Insecta
- Order: Coleoptera
- Suborder: Polyphaga
- Infraorder: Scarabaeiformia
- Family: Scarabaeidae
- Subfamily: Rutelinae
- Tribe: Rutelini; MacLeay, 1819

Synonyms
- Fruhstorferiina Ohaus, 1918; Anticheirina Lacordaire, 1855; Pelidnotina Burmeister, 1844

= Rutelini =

Tribe of beetles

Rutelini is a tribe of shining leaf chafers in the family Scarabaeidae. There are about 14 genera and at least 40 described species in Rutelini.

== Subtribes and Genera ==
- Subtribe Areodina Burmeister, 1844 (59 spp)
  - Areoda MacLeay, 1819 (3 spp)
  - Byrsopolis Burmeister, 1844 (13 spp)
  - Cotalpa Burmeister, 1844 (7 spp)
  - Moronius Grossi & Vaz-de-Mello, 2015 (2 spp)
  - Oplognathus MacLeay, 1819 (3 spp)
  - Parabyrsopolis Ohaus, 1915 (5 spp)
  - Parachrysina Bates, 1888 (6 spp)
  - Paracotalpa Ohaus, 1915 (6 spp)
  - Pseudocotalpa Hardy, 1971 (3 spp)
  - Viridimicus Jameson, 1990 (7 spp)
  - Xenoproctis Kolbe, 1896 (4 spp)
- Subtribe Desmonychina Arrow, 1917 (1 spp)
  - Desmonyx Arrow, 1907 (1 spp)
- Subtribe Didrepanephorina Ohaus, 1918 (18 spp)
  - Didrepanephorus Wood-mason, 1878 (18 spp)
- Subtribe Heterosternina Bates, 1888 (20 spp)
  - Elcarmeniella Franz, 1955 (1 spp)
  - Heterosternus Dupont, 1832 (4 spp)
  - Homoiosternus Ohaus, 1901 (2 spp)
  - Macropoidelimus Morón, 1983 (1 spp)
  - Macropoides Guérin-Méneville, 1844 (3 spp)
  - Mesosternus Morón, 1987 (1 spp)
  - Paraheterosternus Morón, 1983 (1 spp)
  - Parisolea Bates, 1888 (3 spp)
  - Plesiosternus Morón, 1983 (2 spp)
  - Promacropoides Sigwalt, 1987 (2 spp)
- Subtribe Lasiocalina Ohaus, 1918 (34 spp)
  - Homeochlorota Soula, 2006 (1 spp)
  - Lasiocala Blanchard, 1851 (24 spp)
  - Microogenius Gutiérrez, 1951 (7 spp)
  - Pseudochlorota Ohaus, 1905 (2 spp)
- Subtribe Oryctomorphina Burmeister, 1847 (3 spp)
  - Oryctomorphus Guérin-Méneville, 1830 (3 spp)
- Subtribe Parastasiina Burmeister, 1844 (105 spp)
  - Parastasia Westwood, 1841 (105 spp)
- Subtribe Rutelina MacLeay, 1819 (982 spp)
  - Acraspedon Arrow, 1899 (5 spp)
  - Aequatoria Arrow, 1899 (11 spp)
  - Anticheira Eschscholtz, 1818 (4 spp)
  - Anticheiroides Soula, 1998 (12 spp)
  - Badiasis Machatschke, 1970 (3 spp)
  - Calomacraspis Bates, 1888 (3 spp)
  - Catoclastus Solier, 1851 (1 spp)
  - Ceroplophana Gestro, 1893 (2 spp)
  - Chalcentis Burmeister, 1844 (2 spp)
  - Chalcoplethis Burmeister, 1844 (1 spp)
  - Chipita Soula, 2008 (1 spp)
  - Chlorota Burmeister, 1844 (39 spp)
  - Chrysina Kirby, 1828 (131 spp)
  - Chrysophora Dejean, 1821 (1 spp)
  - Chuchina Soula, 2005 (1 spp)
  - Cnemida Kirby, 1827 (8 spp)
  - Crathoplus Blanchard, 1851 (1 spp)
  - Cyphelytra Waterhouse, 1875 (1 spp)
  - Dicaulocephalus Gestro, 1888 (4 spp)
  - Dorysthetus Blanchard, 1845 (28 spp)
  - Ectinoplectron Ohaus, 1915 (1 spp)
  - Epichalcoplethis Bates, 1904 (15 spp)
  - Eremophygus Ohaus, 1910 (2 spp)
  - Exanticheira Soula, 1998 (4 spp)
  - Exochlorota Soula, 2002 (2 spp)
  - Exoptenomela Soula, 2002 (2 spp)
  - Exothyridium Soula, 2002 (7 spp)
  - Fruhstorferia Kolbe, 1894 (9 spp)
  - Heterochlorota Soula, 2002 (2 spp)
  - Homonyx Guérin-Méneville, 1839 (19 spp)
  - Homothermon Ohaus, 1898 (4 spp)
  - Hoplopelidnota Bates, 1904 (1 spp)
  - Hypaspidius Arrow, 1899 (9 spp)
  - Kibakoganea Nagai, 1984 (17 spp)
  - Lagochile Hoffmannsegg, 1817 (72 spp)
  - Lutera Westwood, 1875 (7 spp)
  - Macraspis MacLeay, 1819 (71 spp)
  - Masumotokoganea Hirasawa, 1992 (1 spp)
  - Mecopelidnota Bates, 1904 (9 spp)
  - Mesomerodon Ohaus, 1905 (3 spp)
  - Metapachylus Bates, 1889 (1 spp)
  - Microrutela Bates, 1904 (7 spp)
  - Minidorysthetus Soula, 1998 (13 spp)
  - Mucama Soula, 2002 (2 spp)
  - Nagainokoganea Hirasawa, 1992 (1 spp)
  - Neogutierrezia Martinez, 1953 (10 spp)
  - Oogenius Solier, 1851 (7 spp)
  - Pachacama Soula, 2006 (1 spp)
  - Parachlorota Soula, 2002 (10 spp)
  - Paradorysthetus Soula, 1998 (2 spp)
  - Paramacraspis Ohaus, 1915 (1 spp)
  - Paraptenomela Soula, 2002 (7 spp)
  - Paratelaugis Ohaus, 1915 (6 spp)
  - Parathyridium Ohaus, 1915 (4 spp)
  - Parhomonyx Ohaus, 1915 (1 spp)
  - Parhoplognathus Ohaus, 1915 (5 spp)
  - Patatra Soula, 2008 (1 spp)
  - Pelidnota MacLeay, 1819 (191 spp)
  - †Pelidnotites Cockerell, 1920 (1 spp)
  - Peperonota Westwood, 1847 (3 spp)
  - Peruquime Mondaca & Valencia, 2016 (2 spp)
  - †Petulantis Zhang, Sun & Zhang, 1994 (1 spp)
  - Pichica Soula, 2002 (1 spp)
  - Platyrutela Bates, 1888 (2 spp)
  - Plesiorutela Jameson, 1997 (1 spp)
  - Pseudoanticheiroides Soula, 1998 (2 spp)
  - Pseudodorysthetus Soula, 1998 (1 spp)
  - Pseudogeniates Ohaus, 1910 (3 spp)
  - Pseudohypaspidius Soula, 1998 (11 spp)
  - Pseudomacraspis Ohaus, 1903 (5 spp)
  - Pseudoptenomela Soula, 2002 (3 spp)
  - Pseudothyridium Soula, 2002 (40 spp)
  - Ptenomela Bates, 1888 (25 spp)
  - Pukupuku Muramoto, 2006 (3 spp)
  - Rutela Latreille, 1802 (17 spp)
  - Rutelarcha Waterhouse, 1874 (2 spp)
  - Rutelisca Bates, 1888 (2 spp)
  - Sorocha Soula, 2006 (20 spp)
  - Sphaerorutela Jameson, 1997 (4 spp)
  - Telaugis Burmeister, 1844 (1 spp)
  - Theuremaripa Soula, 2006 (8 spp)
  - Thyridium Burmeister, 1844 (6 spp)
  - Thyriochlorota Ohaus, 1915 (20 spp)
  - Tipicha Soula, 2002 (3 spp)
  - Vayana Ohaus, 1915 (3 spp)
  - Xenochlorota Soula, 2002 (1 spp)
  - Xenopelidnota Bates, 1904 (4 spp)
  - †Zhangsunia Krell, 2000 (1 spp)
