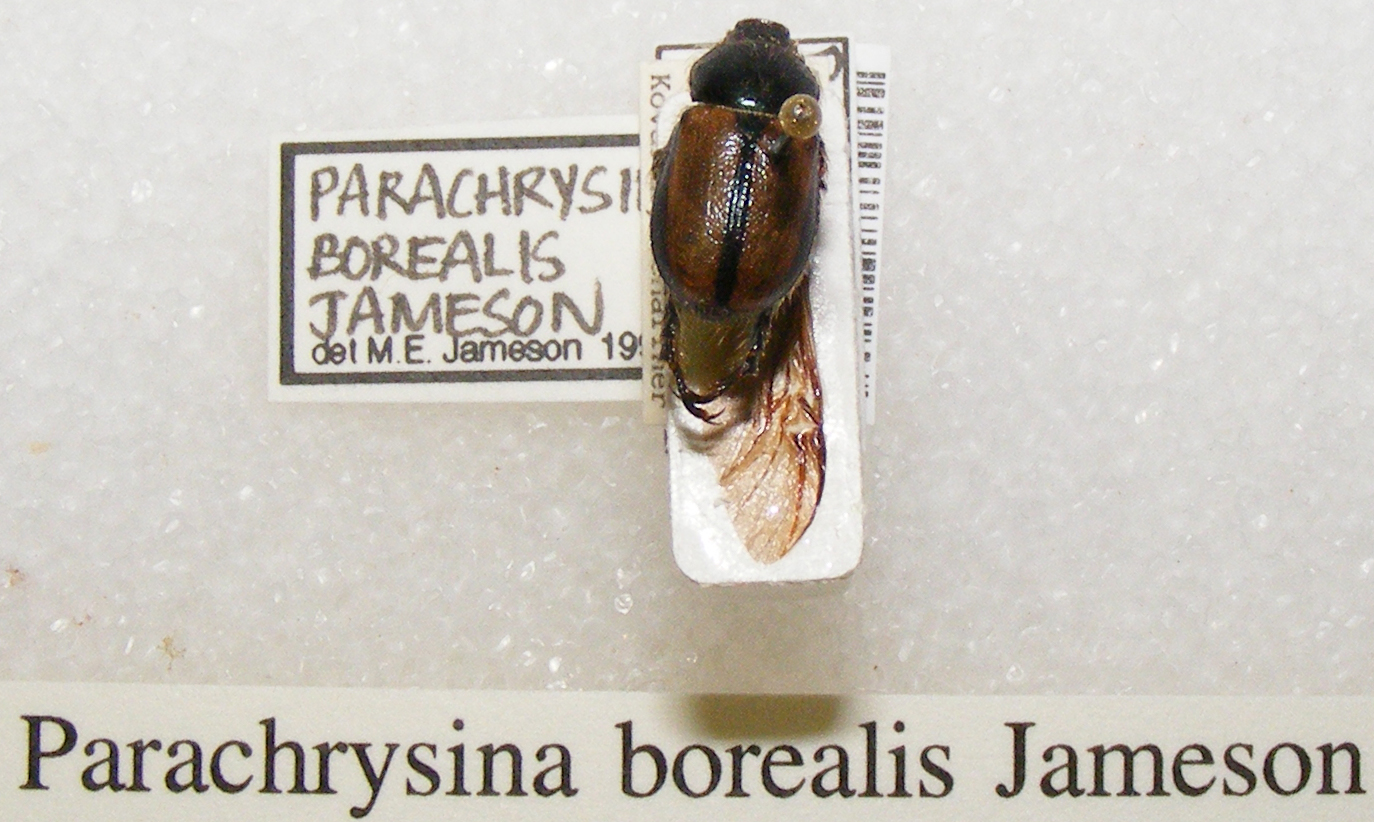
- Parachrysina borealis, adult

Scientific classification
- Kingdom: Animalia
- Phylum: Arthropoda
- Clade: Pancrustacea
- Class: Insecta
- Order: Coleoptera
- Suborder: Polyphaga
- Infraorder: Scarabaeiformia
- Family: Scarabaeidae
- Genus: Parachrysina
- Species: P. borealis

Binomial name
- Parachrysina borealis Jameson, 1991

= Parachrysina borealis =

Species of beetle

Parachrysina borealis is a beetle of the Family Scarabaeidae.
