= Fruhstorferia =

Scientific classification
- Kingdom: Animalia
- Phylum: Arthropoda
- Clade: Pancrustacea
- Class: Insecta
- Order: Coleoptera
- Suborder: Polyphaga
- Infraorder: Scarabaeiformia
- Family: Scarabaeidae
- Subfamily: Rutelinae
- Tribe: Rutelini
- Genus: Fruhstorferia; Kolbe, 1894

Genus of leaf beetles

Fruhstorferia is a genus of beetles belonging to the family Scarabaeidae.

== Species ==
- Fruhstorferia anthracina Ohaus, 1903
- Fruhstorferia baron (Prokofiev, 2013)
- Fruhstorferia dohertyi Ohaus, 1905
- Fruhstorferia egregia Pouillaude, 1915
- Fruhstorferia flavipennis Nagai, 1984
- Fruhstorferia javana Kolbe, 1894
- Fruhstorferia klossi (Ohaus, 1926)
- Fruhstorferia nigromuliebris Nagai, 1984
- Fruhstorferia ohtanii Nagai, 1989
