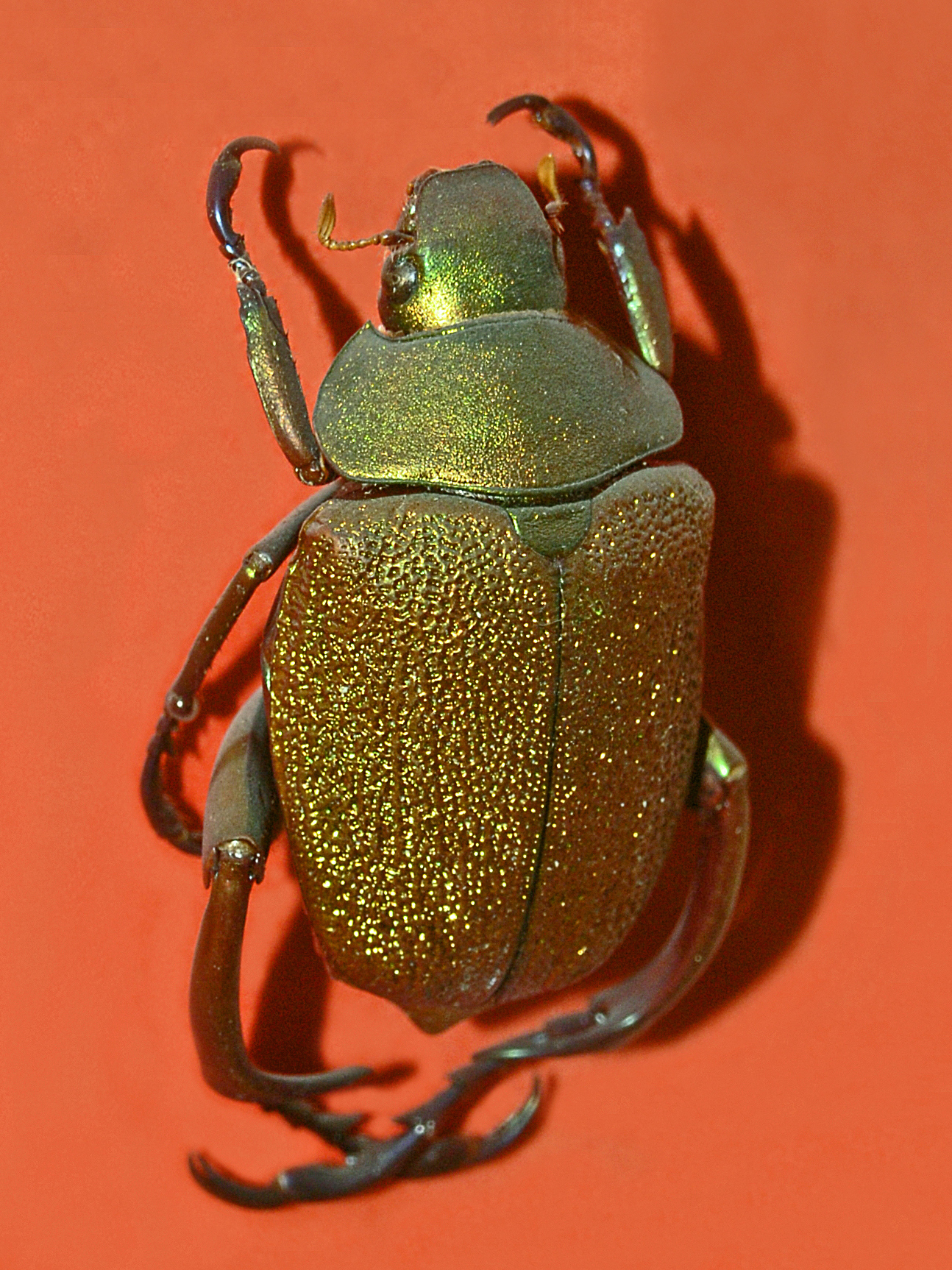
- Museum specimen of Chrysophora chrysochlora, male

Scientific classification
- Kingdom: Animalia
- Phylum: Arthropoda
- Class: Insecta
- Order: Coleoptera
- Suborder: Polyphaga
- Infraorder: Scarabaeiformia
- Family: Scarabaeidae
- Subfamily: Rutelinae
- Tribe: Rutelini
- Subtribe: Rutelina
- Genus: Chrysophora; Dejean, 1821
- Species: C. chrysochlora

Binomial name
- Chrysophora chrysochlora (Latreille, 1811)

Synonyms
- Melolontha chrysochlora Latreille, 1811

= Chrysophora =

Genus of beetles

Chrysophora chrysochlora, the shining leaf chafer beetle, is a species of beetles of the scarab beetle family. It is the only species in the genus Chrysophora.

== Description ==
Chrysophora chrysochlora can reach a length of about 25–40 millimetres (0.98–1.57 in). Body is completely shining metallic green with golden reflections. Elytra have a granulate texture. Males are larger than females and show two strong elongate spurs on the hind legs and enlarged tarsal claws.

== Distribution ==
This species can be found in Colombia, Ecuador and Peru.
