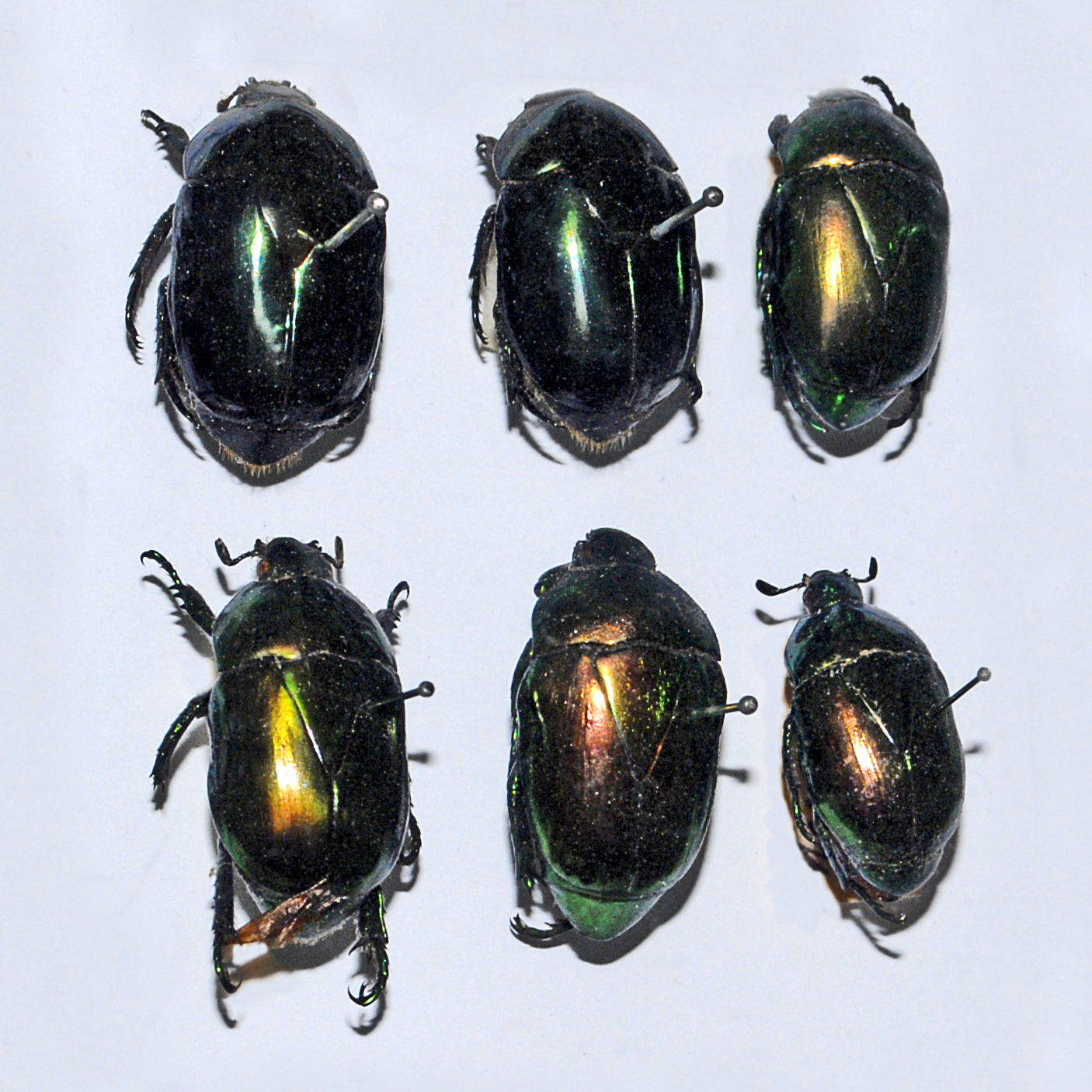
- Macraspis lucida. Mounted specimen.

Scientific classification
- Kingdom: Animalia
- Phylum: Arthropoda
- Clade: Pancrustacea
- Class: Insecta
- Order: Coleoptera
- Suborder: Polyphaga
- Infraorder: Scarabaeiformia
- Family: Scarabaeidae
- Genus: Macraspis
- Species: M. lucida

Binomial name
- Macraspis lucida (Olivier, 1789)

= Macraspis lucida =

Species of beetle

Macraspis lucida is a species of beetle of the family Scarabaeidae. It occurs in Guatemala and Mexico. These beetles can reach a length of about 24–28 millimetres (0.94–1.10 in).
