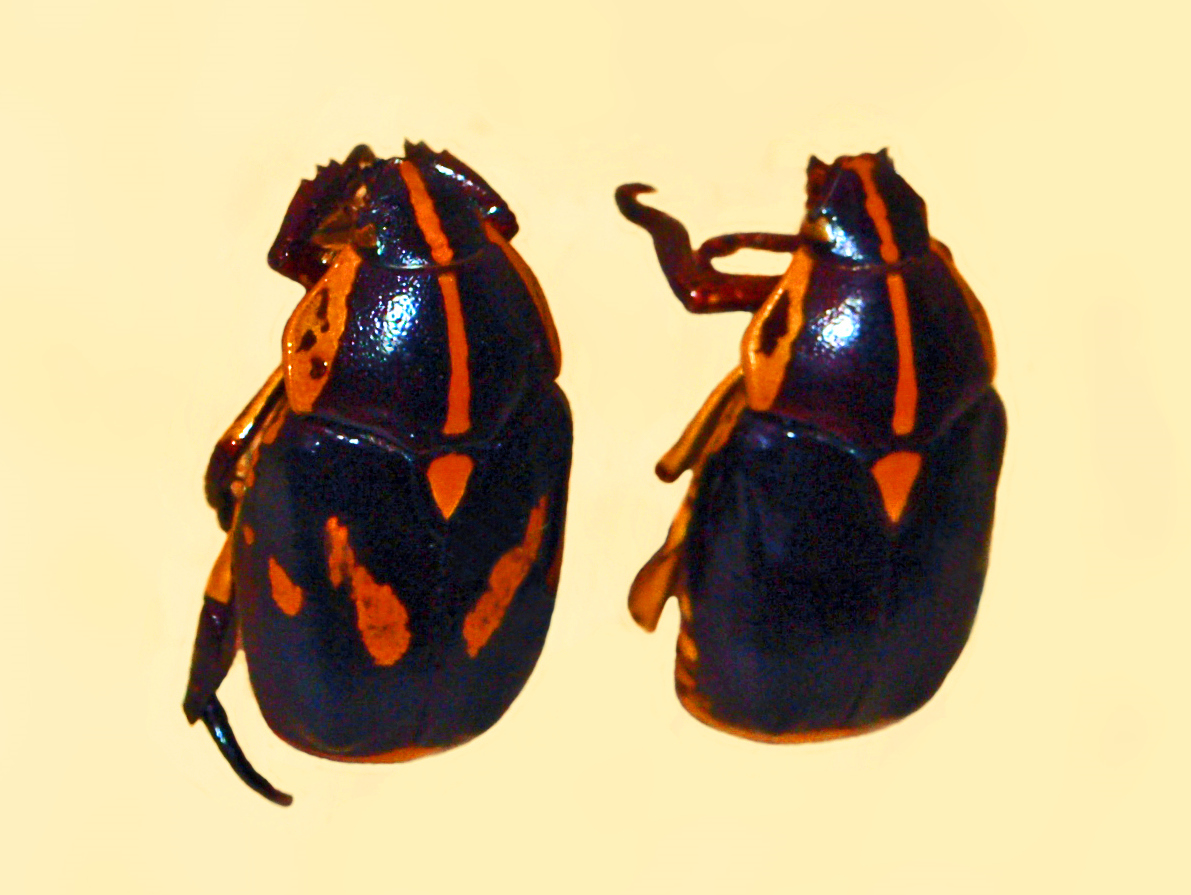
- Rutela lineola from Argentina

Scientific classification
- Kingdom: Animalia
- Phylum: Arthropoda
- Clade: Pancrustacea
- Class: Insecta
- Order: Coleoptera
- Suborder: Polyphaga
- Infraorder: Scarabaeiformia
- Family: Scarabaeidae
- Genus: Rutela
- Species: R. lineola

Binomial name
- Rutela lineola (Linnaeus, 1758)

= Rutela lineola =

Species of beetle

Rutela lineola is a species of beetles from the family Scarabaeidae.

== Description ==
Rutela lineola can reach a length of about 16–20 mm. This species is very variable. The basic colour is black, with white, yellow, orange or reddish markings on the head, the pronotum and the elytra. Adults feed on flowers and on decaying wood. Larvae are xylophagous and they are usually found inside decaying trunks.

== Distribution ==
This species can be found in Argentina, Paraguay, Uruguay, Brazil, Colombia and Peru.
