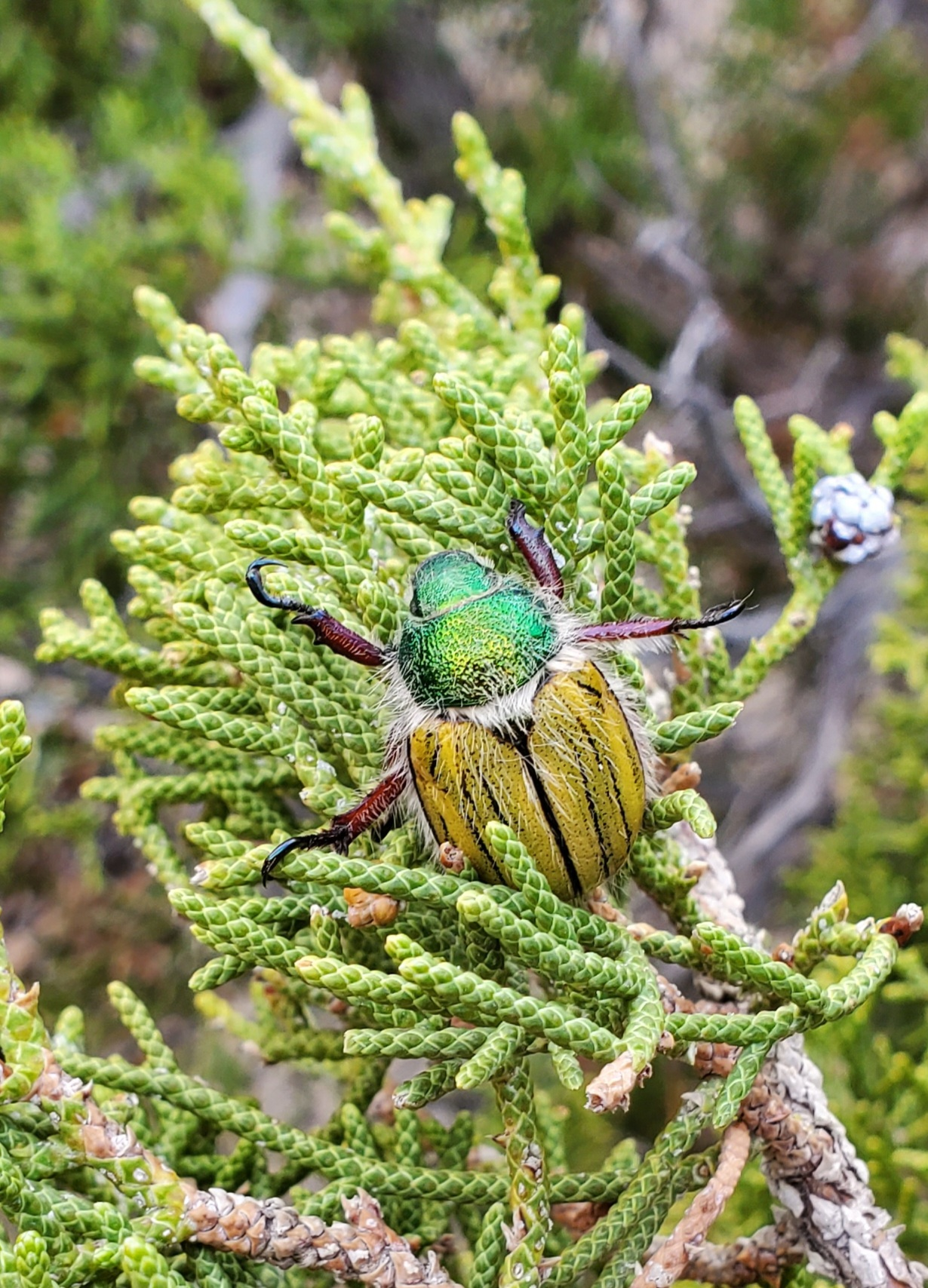
- Paracotalpa puncticollis, adult, feeding on juniper leaves.

Scientific classification
- Kingdom: Animalia
- Phylum: Arthropoda
- Clade: Pancrustacea
- Class: Insecta
- Order: Coleoptera
- Suborder: Polyphaga
- Infraorder: Scarabaeiformia
- Family: Scarabaeidae
- Genus: Paracotalpa
- Species: P. puncticollis

Binomial name
- Paracotalpa puncticollis (LeConte, 1863)

= Paracotalpa puncticollis =

Species of beetle

Paracotalpa puncticollis is a beetle of the family Scarabaeidae. Commonly referred to as the punctate little bear, they range from California to New Mexico. It is usually found in piñon-juniper ecosystems where it feeds on juniper leaves. Little research has been published on the species, with the last journal article being published in 1972. P. puncticollis biology is poorly understood, but it appears to be active between February and May, with peak activity occurring in April.

== Images ==
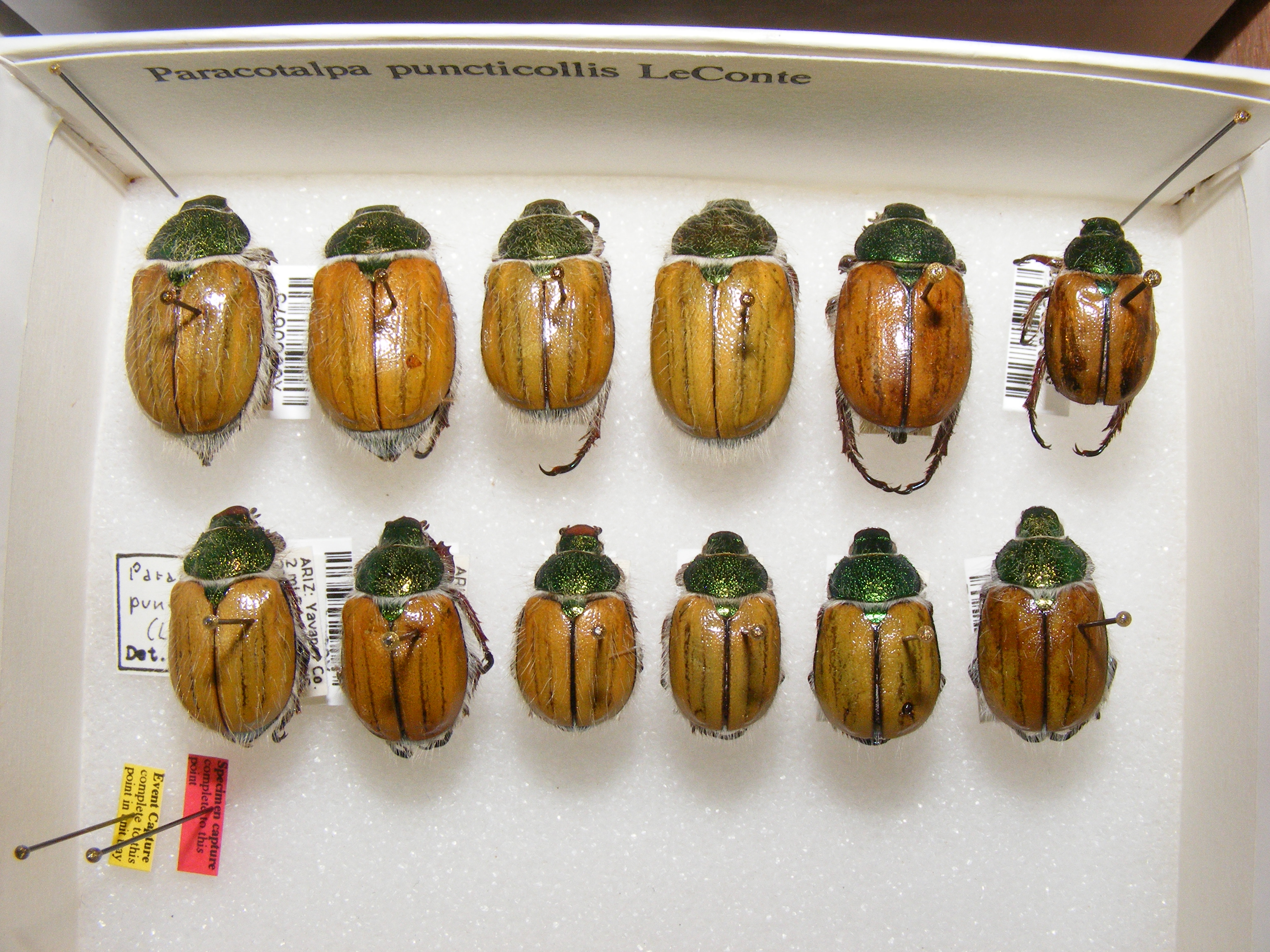
Specimen collection
