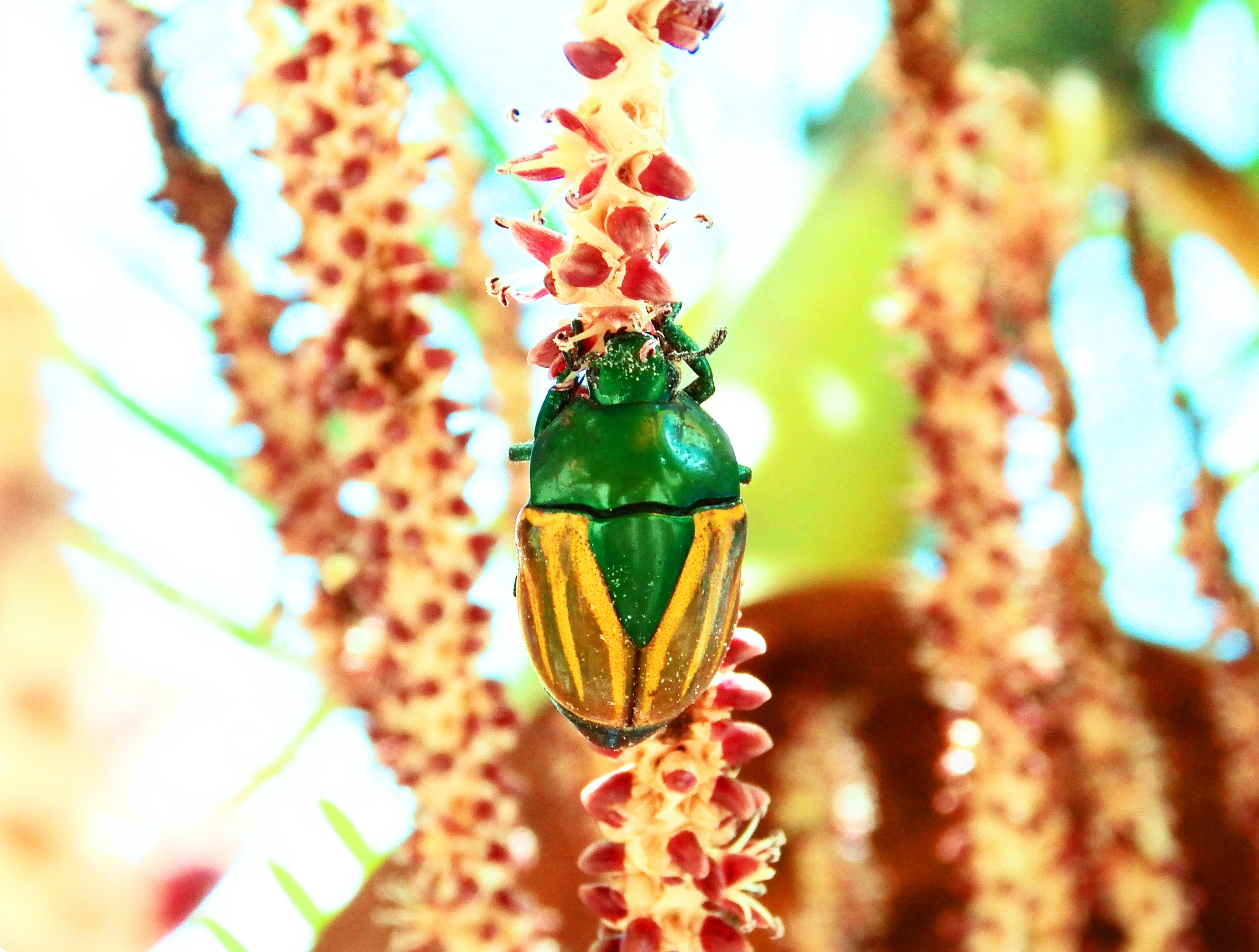

Scientific classification
- Kingdom: Animalia
- Phylum: Arthropoda
- Class: Insecta
- Order: Coleoptera
- Suborder: Polyphaga
- Infraorder: Scarabaeiformia
- Family: Scarabaeidae
- Genus: Macraspis
- Species: M. festiva

Binomial name
- Macraspis festiva Burmeister, 1844

= Macraspis festiva =

Species of beetle

Macraspis festiva is a species of beetles in the family Scarabaeidae.
