= Paracotalpa =

- Paracotalpa granicollis, adult

Scientific classification
- Kingdom: Animalia
- Phylum: Arthropoda
- Clade: Pancrustacea
- Class: Insecta
- Order: Coleoptera
- Suborder: Polyphaga
- Infraorder: Scarabaeiformia
- Family: Scarabaeidae
- Tribe: Rutelini
- Genus: Paracotalpa; Ohaus, 1915

Species
- See text

Genus of beetles

Paracotalpa is a genus of beetles in the family Scarabaeidae. Their known range is west of the Rocky Mountains, from southern Washington state to California and Arizona. They are nicknamed "little bears" because the adults of the genus have a fuzzy or hairy appearance.

== Species ==
- Paracotalpa deserta Saylor, 1940
- Paracotalpa granicollis (Haldeman, 1852)
- Paracotalpa puncticollis (LeConte, 1863)
- Paracotalpa ursina (Horn, 1867)

Species data retrieved from Integrated Taxonomic Information System.
