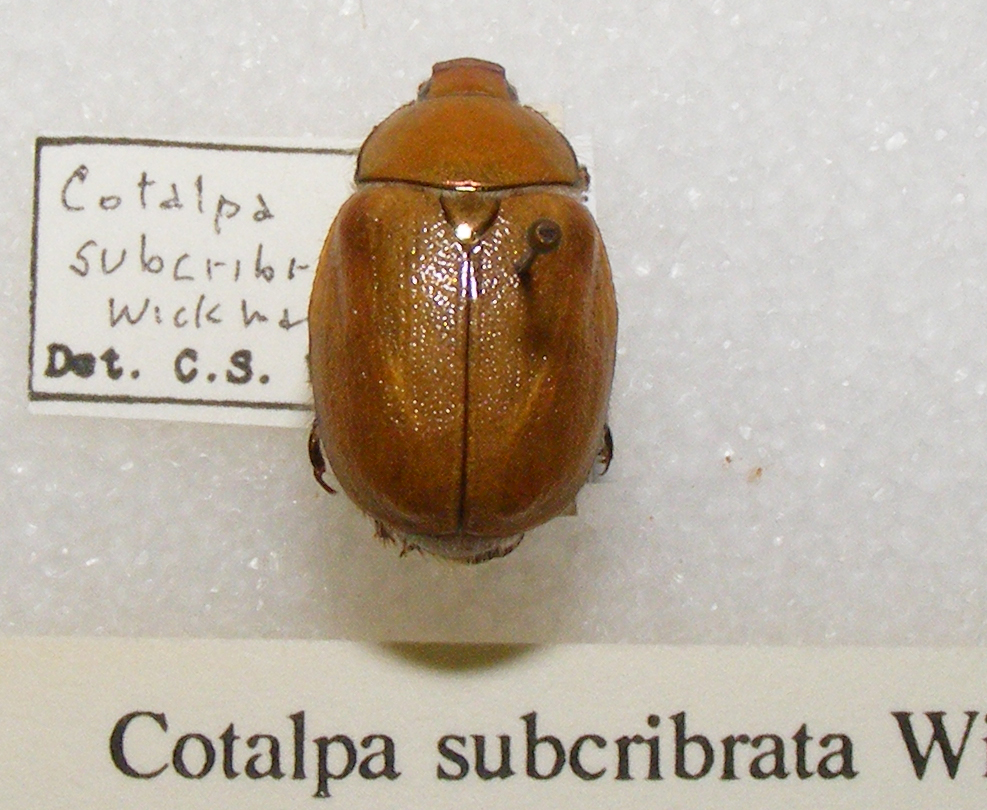
- Cotalpa subcribrata, adult

Scientific classification
- Kingdom: Animalia
- Phylum: Arthropoda
- Clade: Pancrustacea
- Class: Insecta
- Order: Coleoptera
- Suborder: Polyphaga
- Infraorder: Scarabaeiformia
- Family: Scarabaeidae
- Genus: Cotalpa
- Species: C. subcribrata

Binomial name
- Cotalpa subcribrata Wickham

= Cotalpa subcribrata =

Species of beetle

Cotalpa subcribrata is a beetle of the family Scarabaeidae.

== Gallery ==
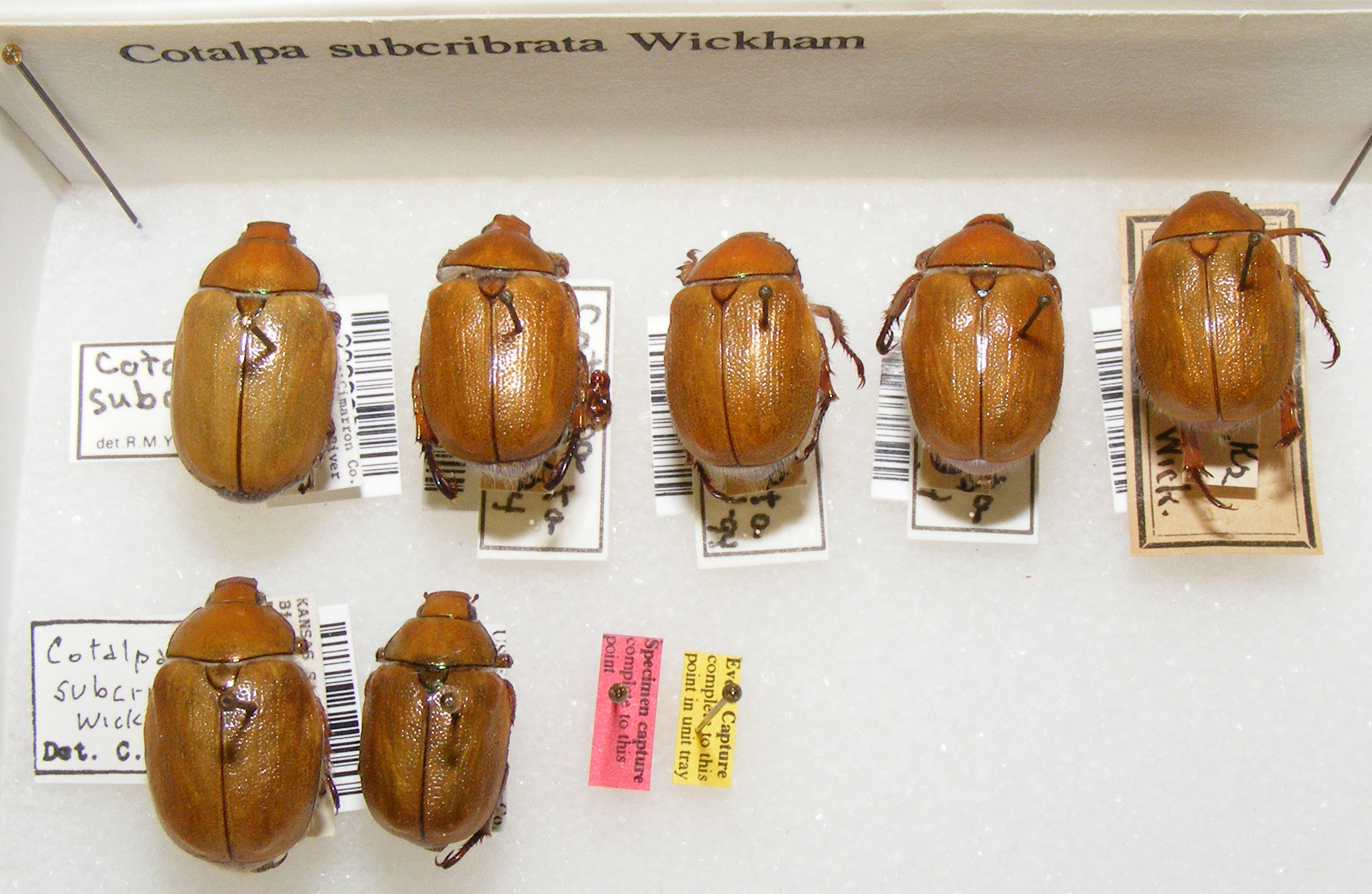
Specimen collection
