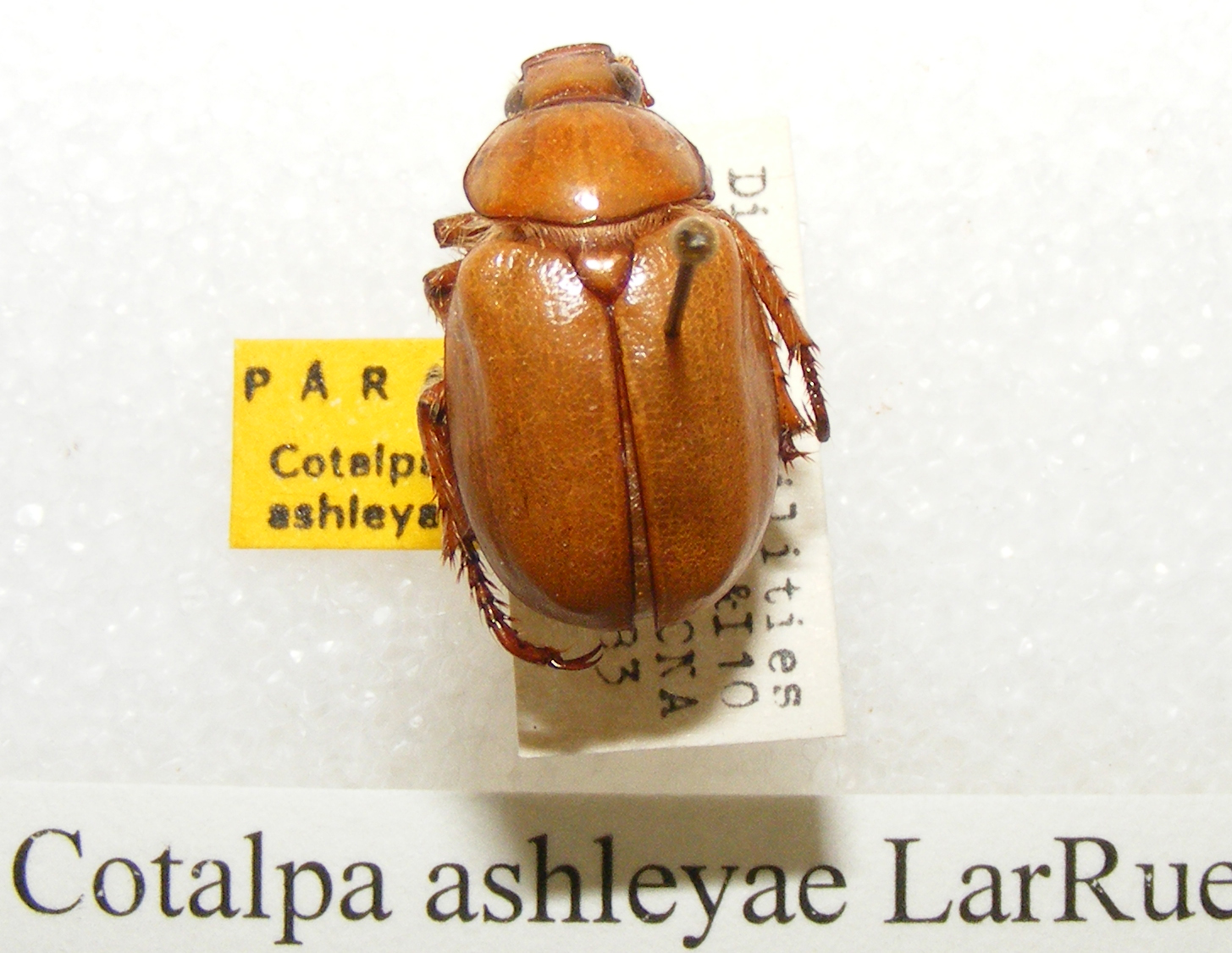
- Cotalpa ashleyae paratype from the Texas A&M University Insect Collection.

Scientific classification
- Kingdom: Animalia
- Phylum: Arthropoda
- Clade: Pancrustacea
- Class: Insecta
- Order: Coleoptera
- Suborder: Polyphaga
- Infraorder: Scarabaeiformia
- Family: Scarabaeidae
- Tribe: Rutelini
- Genus: Cotalpa; Burmeiser, 1844

Species
- See text

= Cotalpa =

Genus of beetles

Cotalpa is a genus of beetle in the family Scarabaeidae. All six species within the genus are found in the Nearctic realm.

== Species ==
- Cotalpa ashleyae
- Cotalpa conclamara
- Cotalpa consobrina
- Cotalpa flavida
- Cotalpa lanigera
- Cotalpa subcribrata
