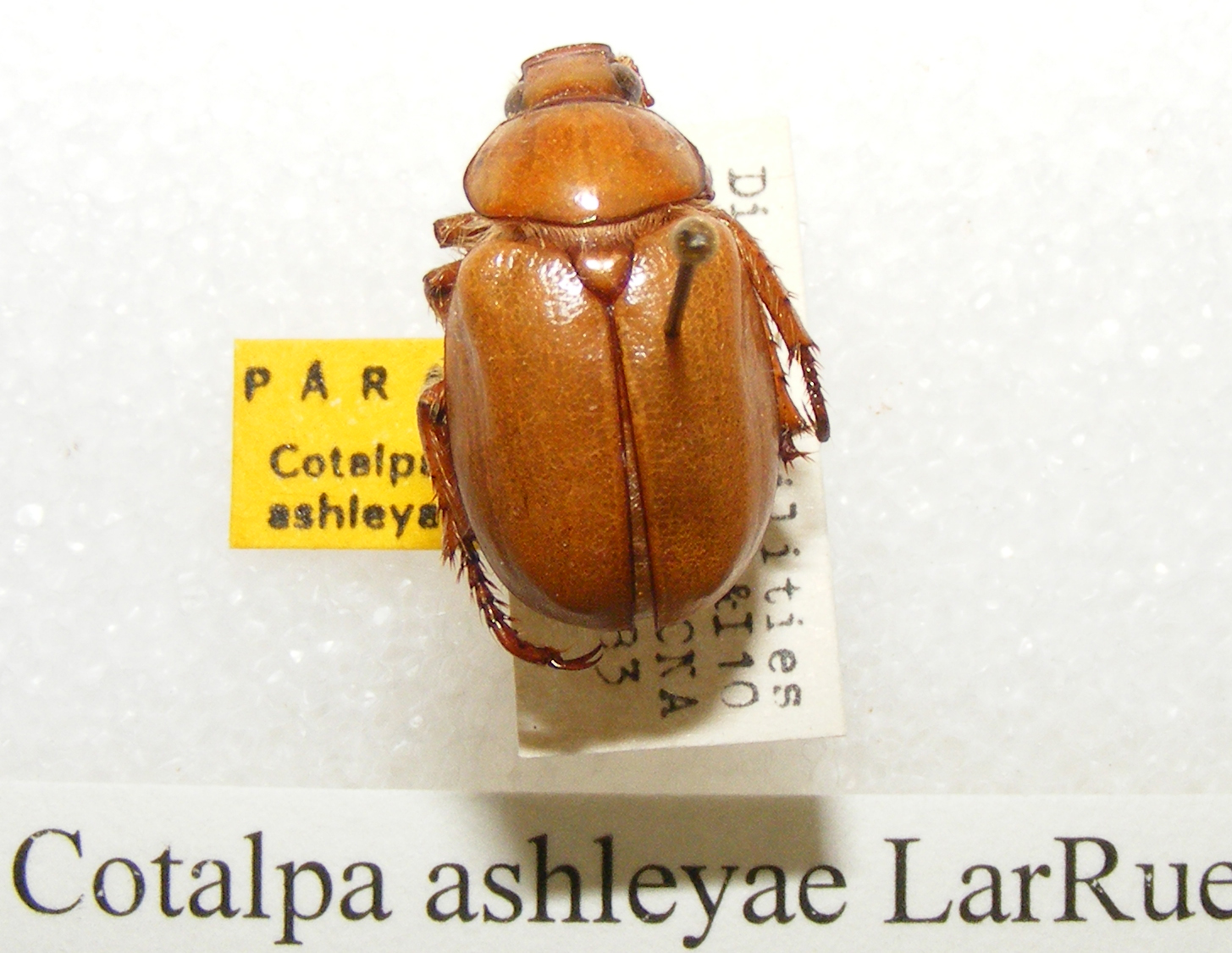
- Cotalpa ashleyae, paratype

Scientific classification
- Kingdom: Animalia
- Phylum: Arthropoda
- Clade: Pancrustacea
- Class: Insecta
- Order: Coleoptera
- Suborder: Polyphaga
- Infraorder: Scarabaeiformia
- Family: Scarabaeidae
- Genus: Cotalpa
- Species: C. ashleyae

Binomial name
- Cotalpa ashleyae LarRue

= Cotalpa ashleyae =

Species of beetle

Cotalpa ashleyae is a beetle of the family Scarabaeidae.
