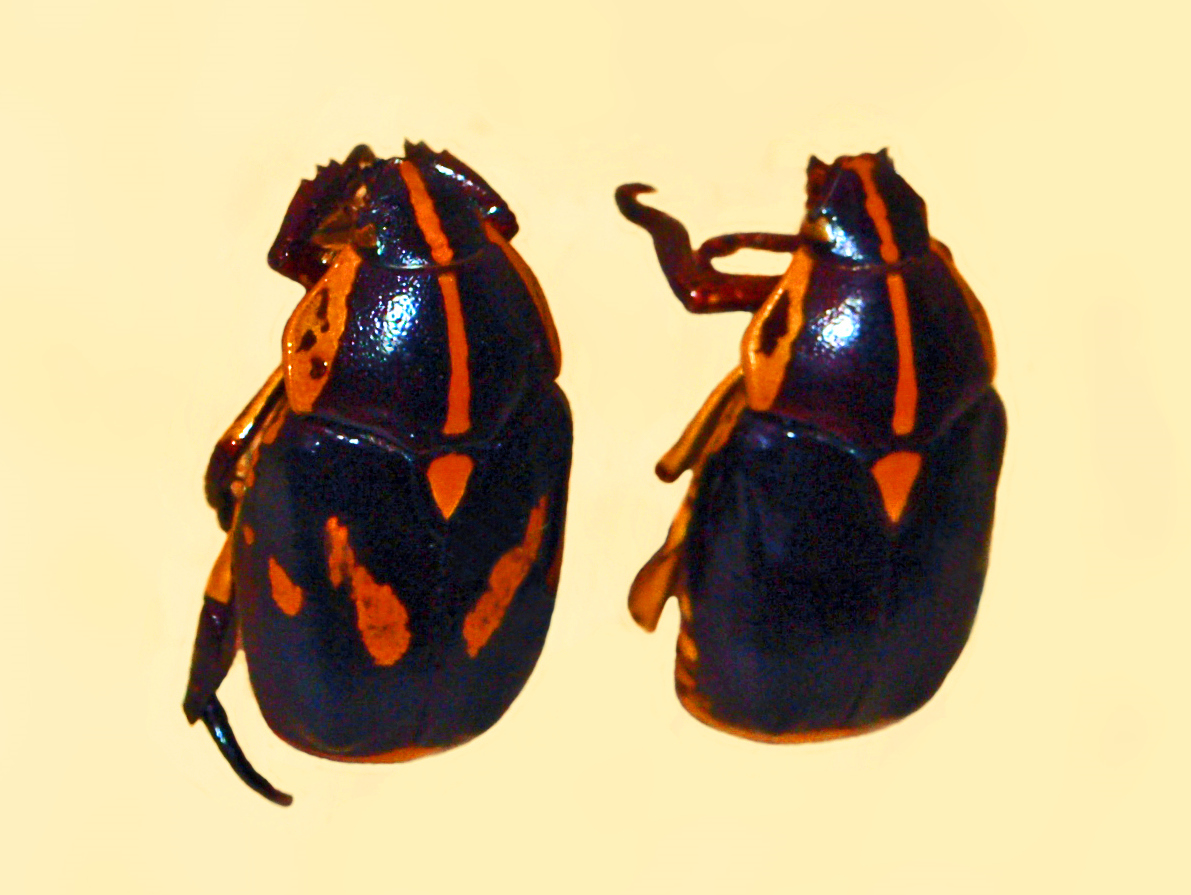
- Rutela lineola from Argentina

Scientific classification
- Kingdom: Animalia
- Phylum: Arthropoda
- Class: Insecta
- Order: Coleoptera
- Suborder: Polyphaga
- Infraorder: Scarabaeiformia
- Family: Scarabaeidae
- Tribe: Rutelini
- Genus: Rutela; Latreille, 1802

Species
- See text

= Rutela =

Genus of beetles

Rutela is a genus of beetles from the family Scarabaeidae.

== Species ==
The genus includes the following species:

- Rutela formosa Burmeister, 1844
- Rutela lineola (Linnaeus, 1767)
