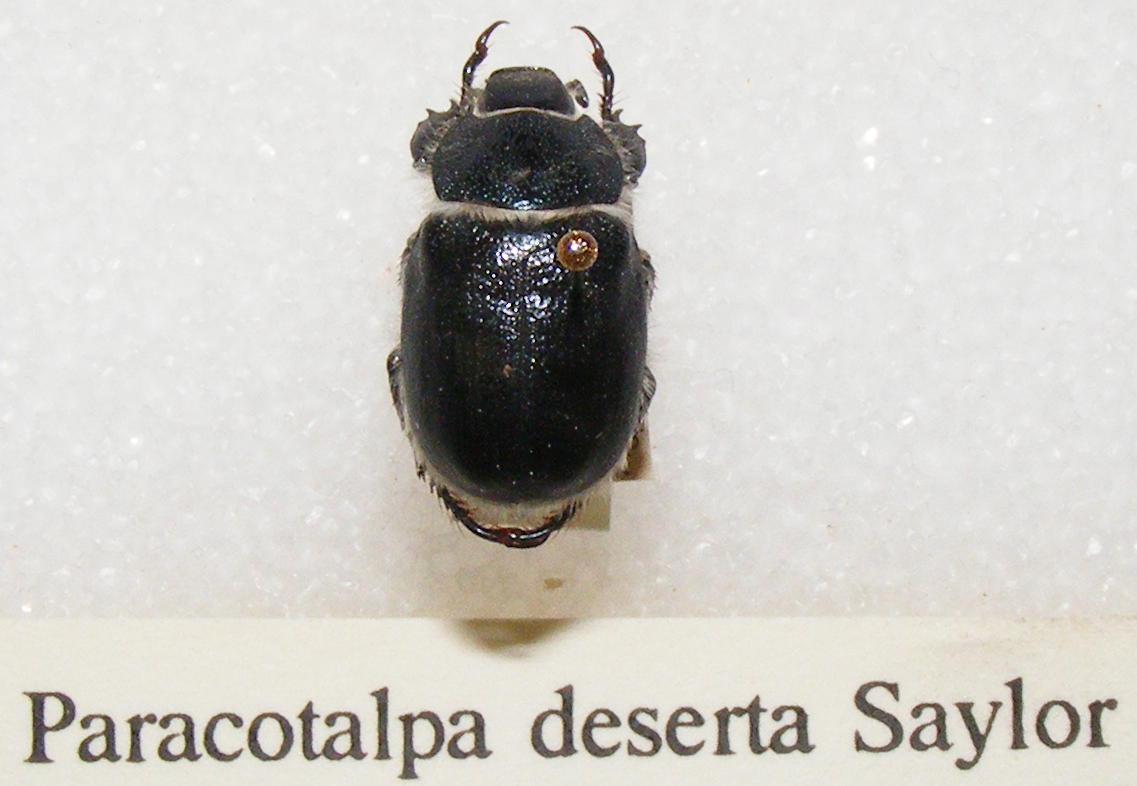
- Paracotalpa deserta, adult

Scientific classification
- Kingdom: Animalia
- Phylum: Arthropoda
- Clade: Pancrustacea
- Class: Insecta
- Order: Coleoptera
- Suborder: Polyphaga
- Infraorder: Scarabaeiformia
- Family: Scarabaeidae
- Genus: Paracotalpa
- Species: P. deserta

Binomial name
- Paracotalpa deserta Saylor, 1940

= Paracotalpa deserta =

Species of beetle

Paracotalpa deserta is a beetle in the family Scarabaeidae.

== Images ==
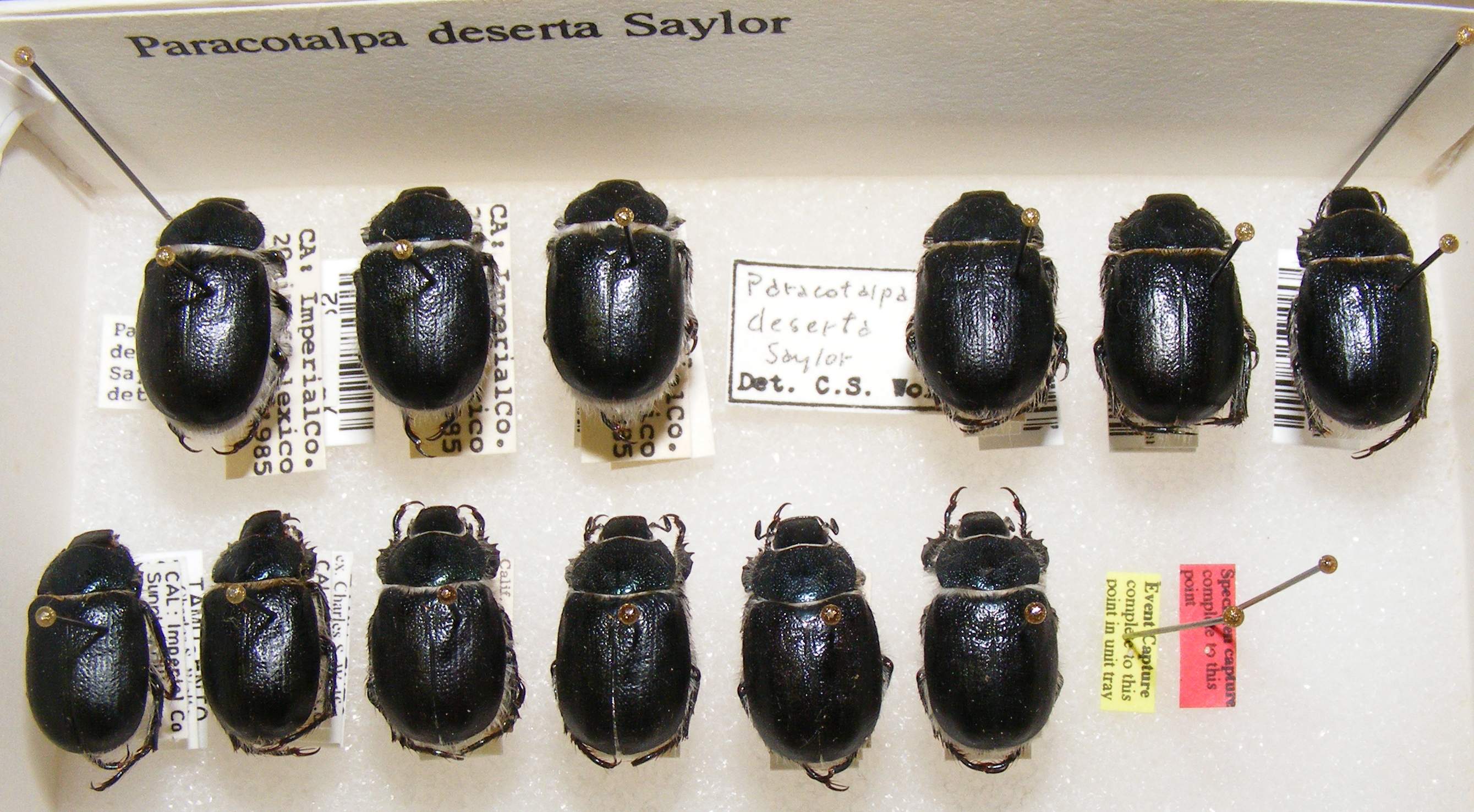
Specimen collection
