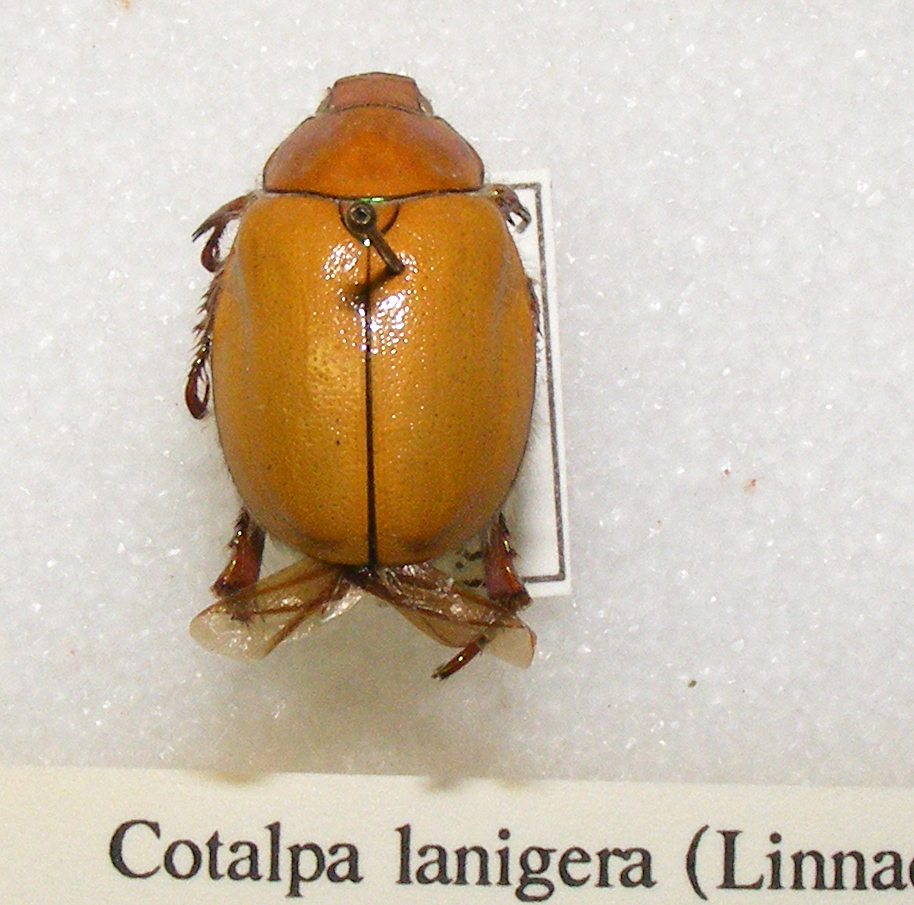
- Cotalpa lanigera, adult

Scientific classification
- Kingdom: Animalia
- Phylum: Arthropoda
- Clade: Pancrustacea
- Class: Insecta
- Order: Coleoptera
- Suborder: Polyphaga
- Infraorder: Scarabaeiformia
- Family: Scarabaeidae
- Genus: Cotalpa
- Species: C. lanigera

Binomial name
- Cotalpa lanigera (Linnaeus, 1758)

= Cotalpa lanigera =

Species of beetle

Cotalpa lanigera, also known as the Goldsmith beetle, is a beetle of the family Scarabaeidae. Its adult size ranges from 19 to 26 mm. Its head and pronotum are yellow-brown, while its elytra are usually paler yellow. Nocturnally active, it may be found in late spring to early summer feeding on the leaves of trees such as poplars, silver maple, sweetgum, pear, hickory, or willow.
