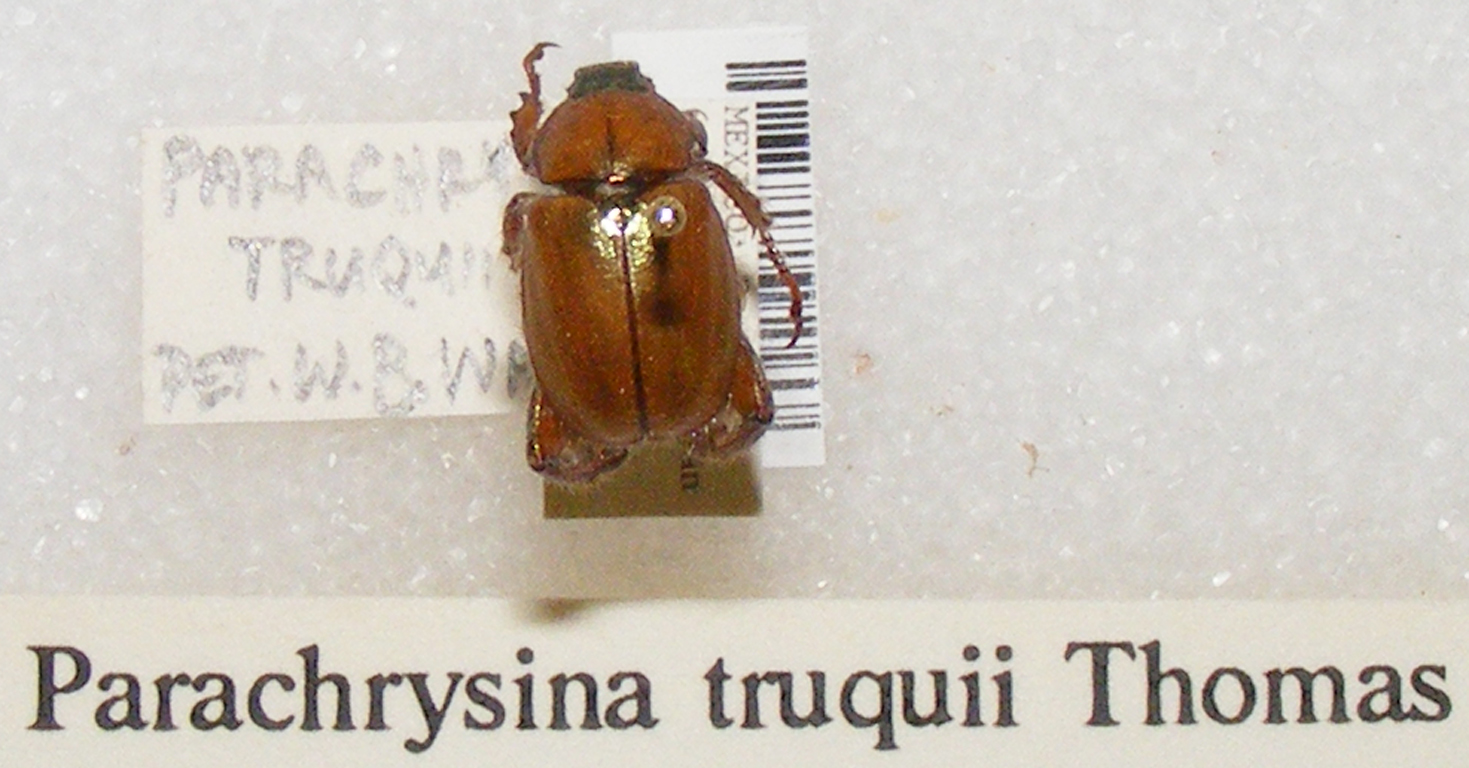
- Parachrysina truquii

Scientific classification
- Kingdom: Animalia
- Phylum: Arthropoda
- Clade: Pancrustacea
- Class: Insecta
- Order: Coleoptera
- Suborder: Polyphaga
- Infraorder: Scarabaeiformia
- Family: Scarabaeidae
- Tribe: Rutelini
- Genus: Parachrysina; Bates, 1888

= Parachrysina =

Genus of beetles

Parachrysina is a genus of beetles in the family Scarabaeidae.

== Species ==
- Parachrysina borealis
- Parachrysina truquii
