= Cotalpa flavida =

Scientific classification
- Kingdom: Animalia
- Phylum: Arthropoda
- Clade: Pancrustacea
- Class: Insecta
- Order: Coleoptera
- Suborder: Polyphaga
- Infraorder: Scarabaeiformia
- Family: Scarabaeidae
- Genus: Cotalpa
- Species: C. flavida

Binomial name
- Cotalpa flavida Horn, 1878

Species of beetle

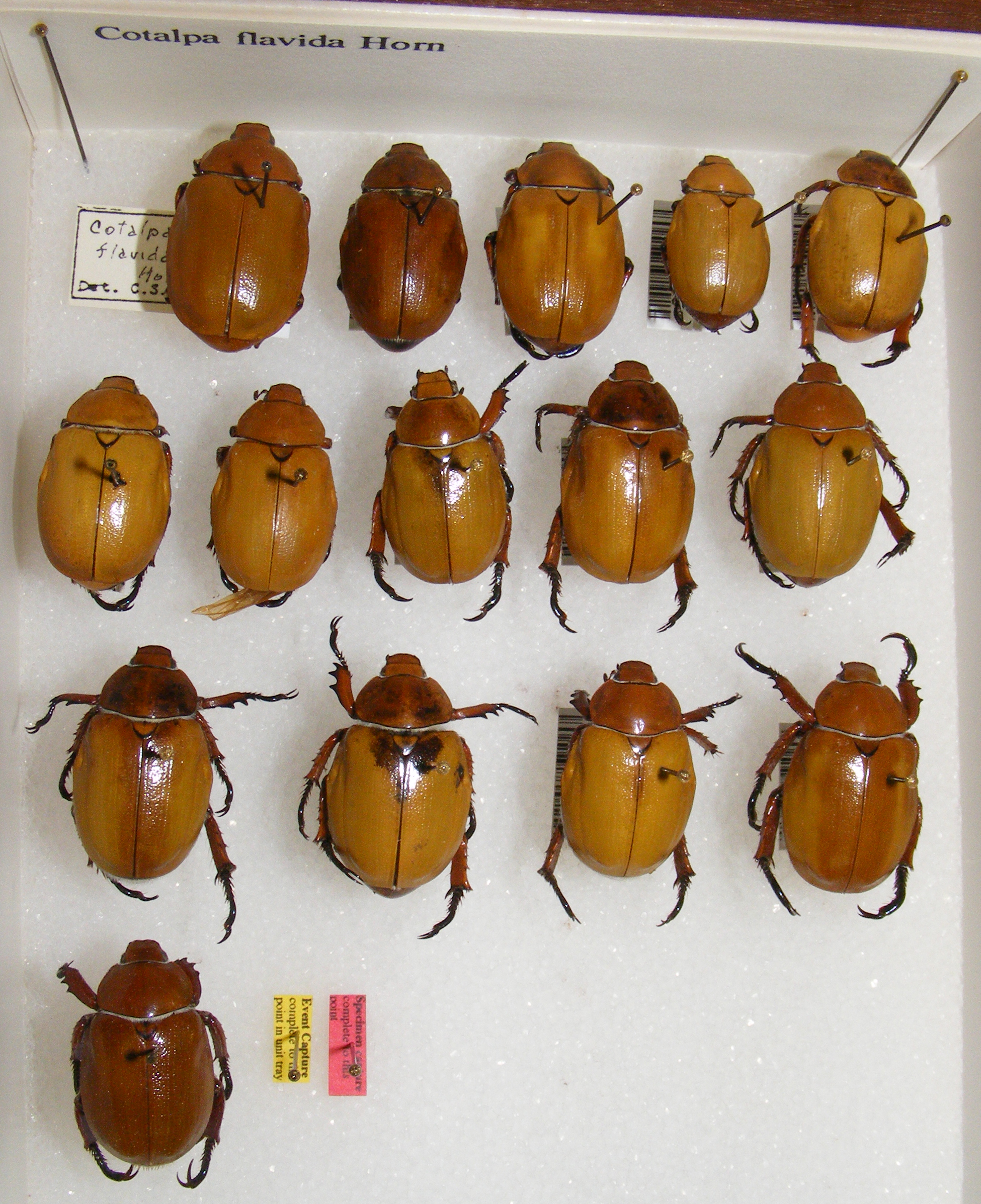
Cotalpa flavida adult variation

Cotalpa flavida is a species of beetle in the family Scarabaeidae.
