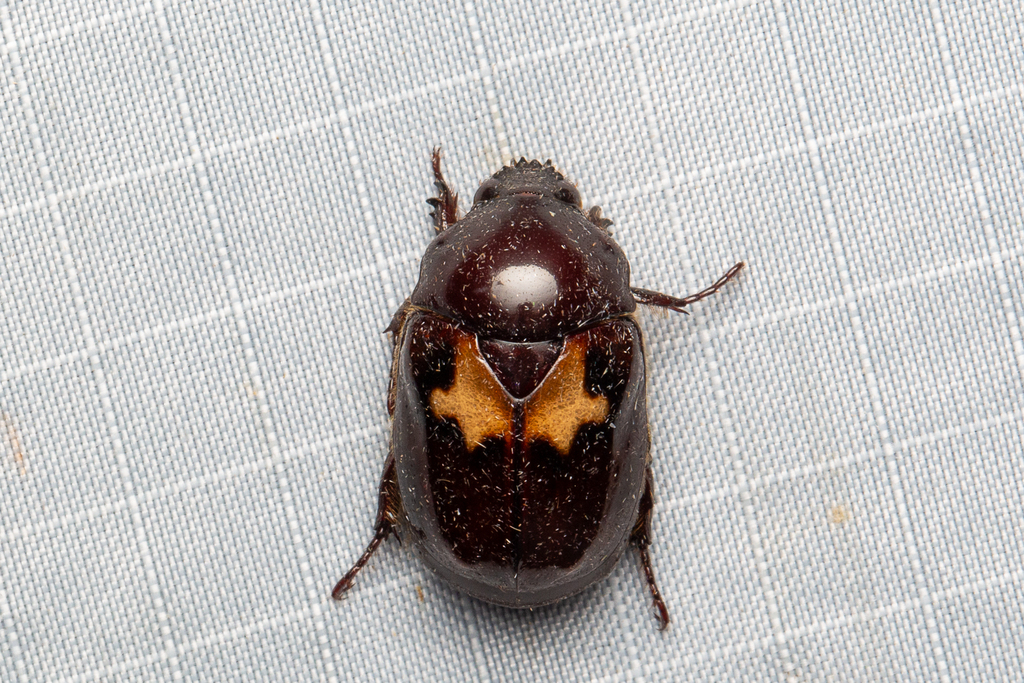

Scientific classification
- Kingdom: Animalia
- Phylum: Arthropoda
- Clade: Pancrustacea
- Class: Insecta
- Order: Coleoptera
- Suborder: Polyphaga
- Infraorder: Scarabaeiformia
- Family: Scarabaeidae
- Genus: Fruhstorferia
- Species: F. klossi

Binomial name
- Fruhstorferia klossi (Ohaus, 1926)

Synonyms
- Parastasia klossi Ohaus, 1926

= Fruhstorferia klossi =

Species of beetle

Fruhstorferia klossi is a species of beetle of the family Scarabaeidae. It is found in Malaysia.

== Description ==
Adults reach a length of about 17–20.5 mm (0.67–0.81 in). The head is dark reddish to black, while the pronotum and scutellum are various shades of dark red. The elytra are reddish brown, often darkest along a yellowish brown area in the basal part. The underside and legs are dark reddish brown.
