= Paracotalpa granicollis =

- Paracotalpa granicollis, adult

Scientific classification
- Kingdom: Animalia
- Phylum: Arthropoda
- Clade: Pancrustacea
- Class: Insecta
- Order: Coleoptera
- Suborder: Polyphaga
- Infraorder: Scarabaeiformia
- Family: Scarabaeidae
- Genus: Paracotalpa
- Species: P. granicollis

Binomial name
- Paracotalpa granicollis (Haldeman, 1852)

Species of beetle

Paracotalpa granicollis is a beetle of the family Scarabaeidae. The species is found in the Intermountain West of North America, including the Columbia Plateau, Great Basin, and Colorado Plateau.

== Images ==
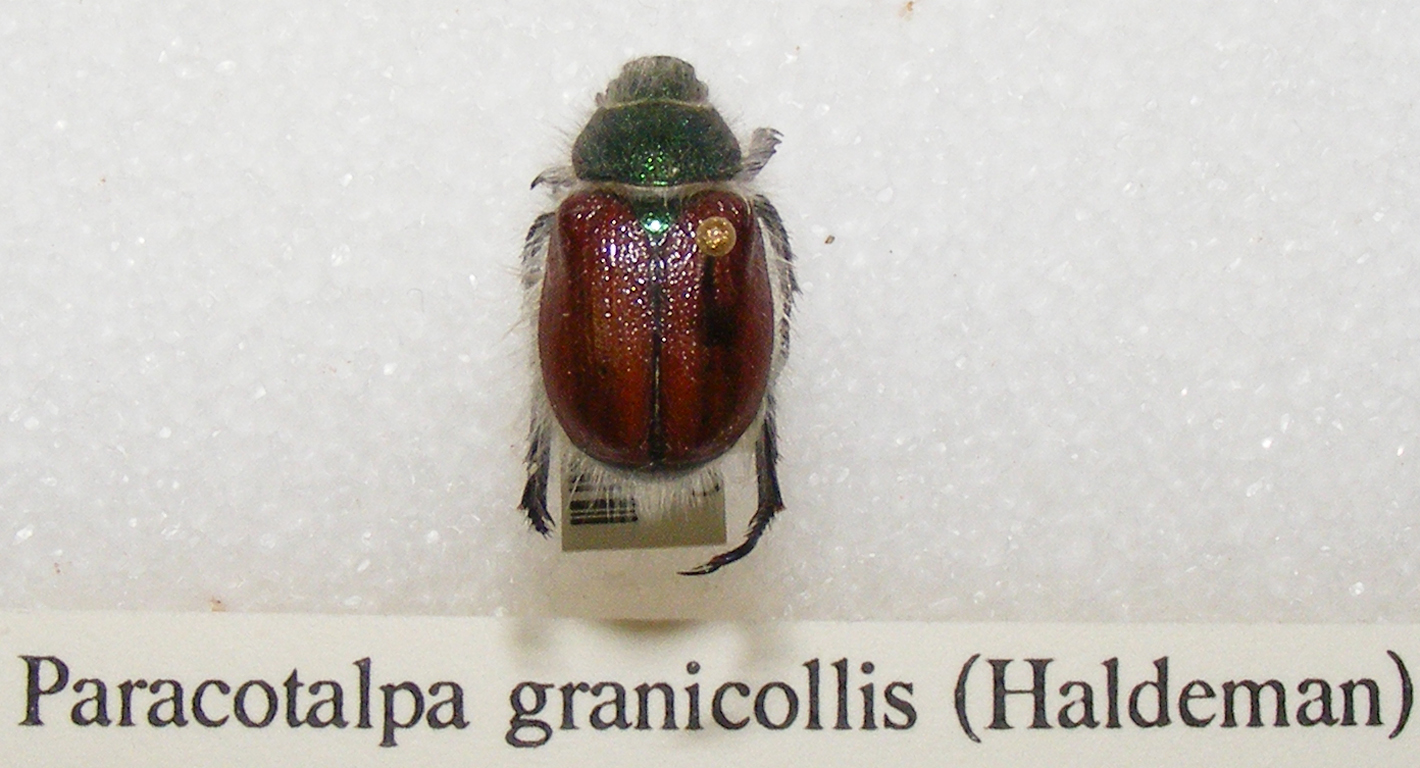
Paracotalpa granicollis, adult specimen

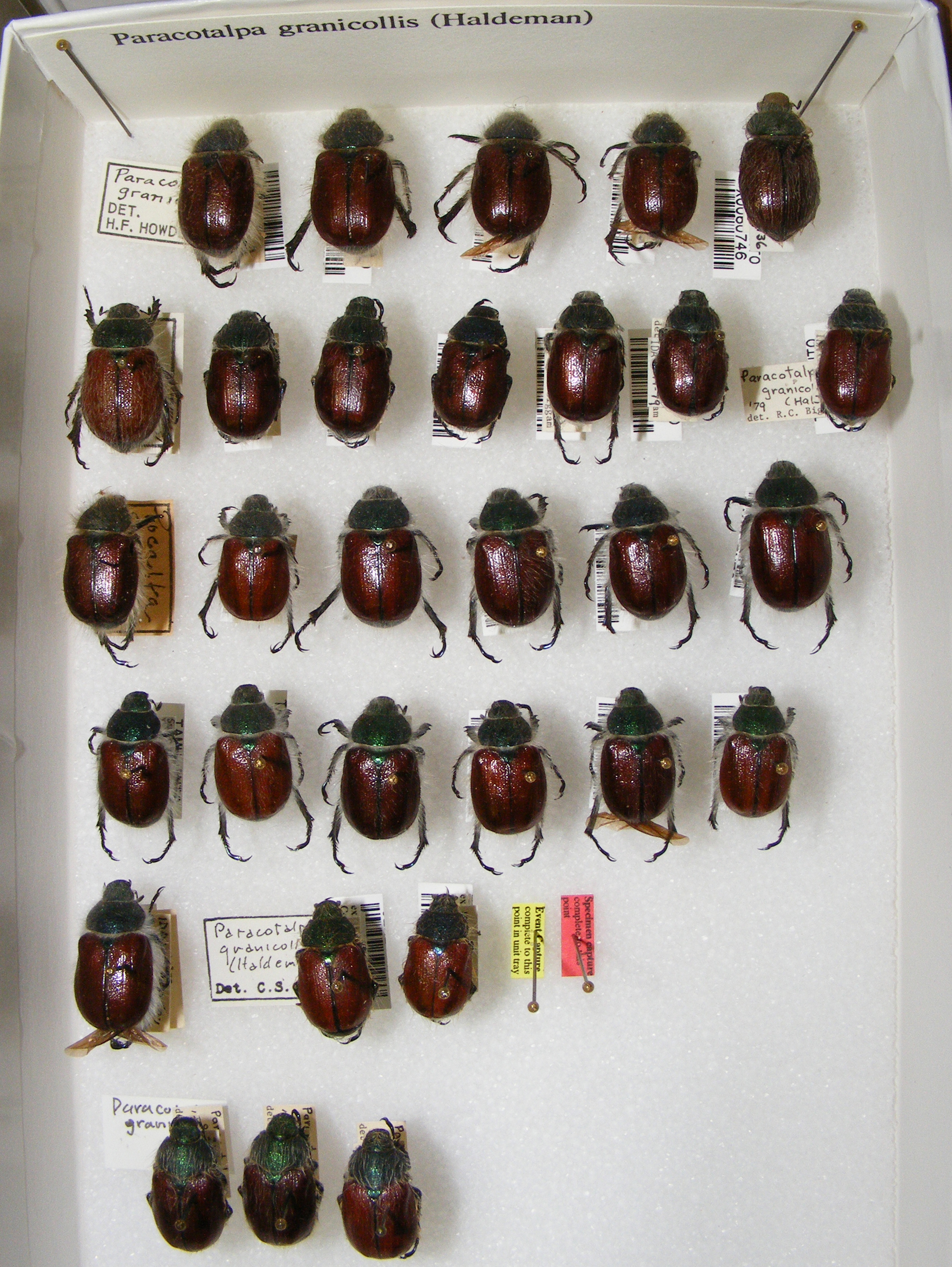
Specimen collection
