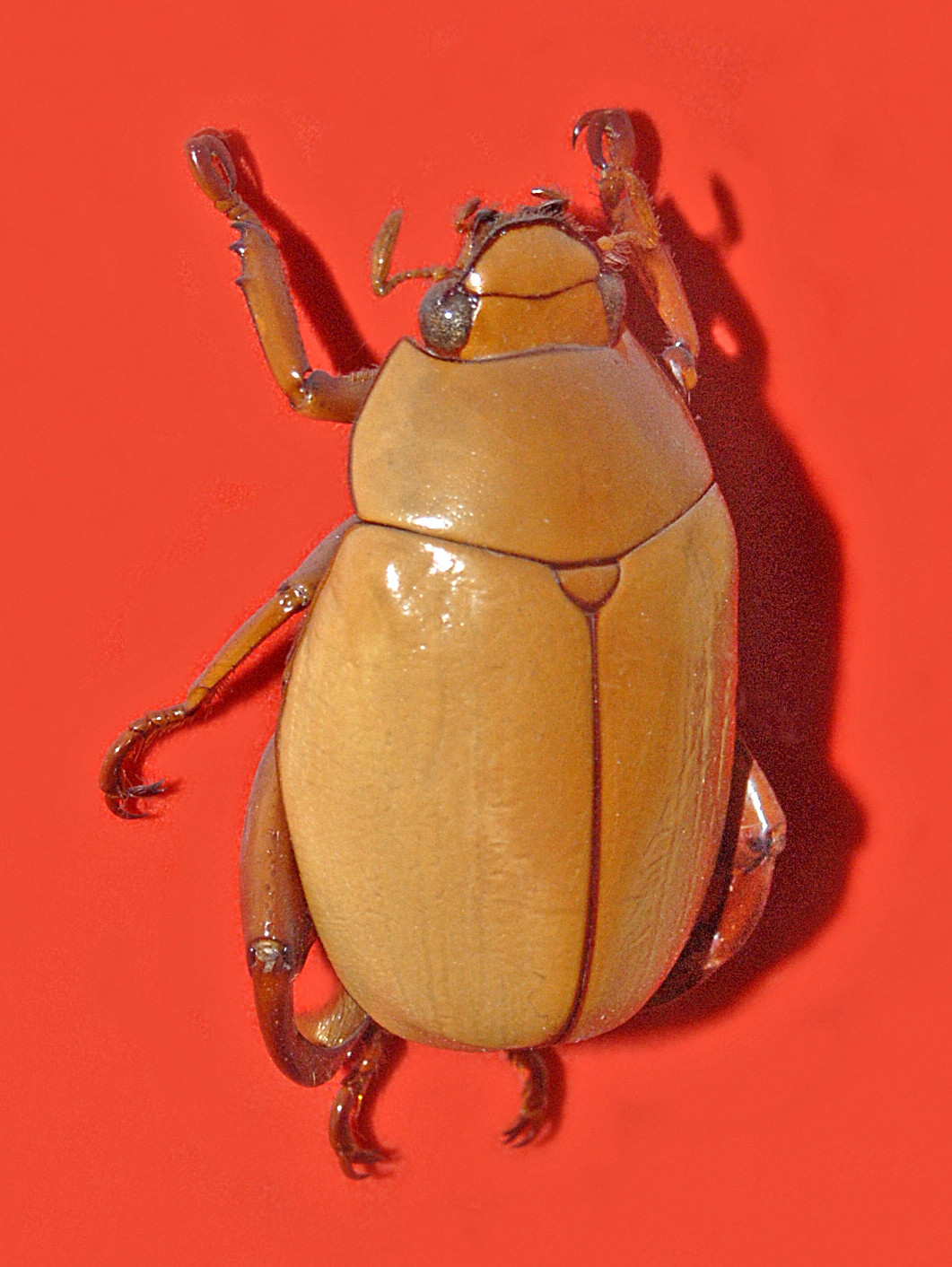
- Museum specimen of Macropoides crassipes

Scientific classification
- Domain: Eukaryota
- Kingdom: Animalia
- Phylum: Arthropoda
- Class: Insecta
- Order: Coleoptera
- Suborder: Polyphaga
- Infraorder: Scarabaeiformia
- Family: Scarabaeidae
- Genus: Macropoides
- Species: M. crassipes

Binomial name
- Macropoides crassipes (Horn, 1866)

= Macropoides crassipes =

Species of beetle

Macropoides crassipes is a species of beetles of the scarab beetle family.

== Description ==
Macropoides crassipes can reach a length of about 25 millimetres (0.98 in). Head, pronotum and elytra are completely yellow, with brown legs. Larvae develop in rotten logs. Adults can be found from March to December.

== Distribution and habitat ==
This species can be found in rain forests of the southern México at an elevation of 100–1,600 metres (330–5,250 ft) above sea level.
