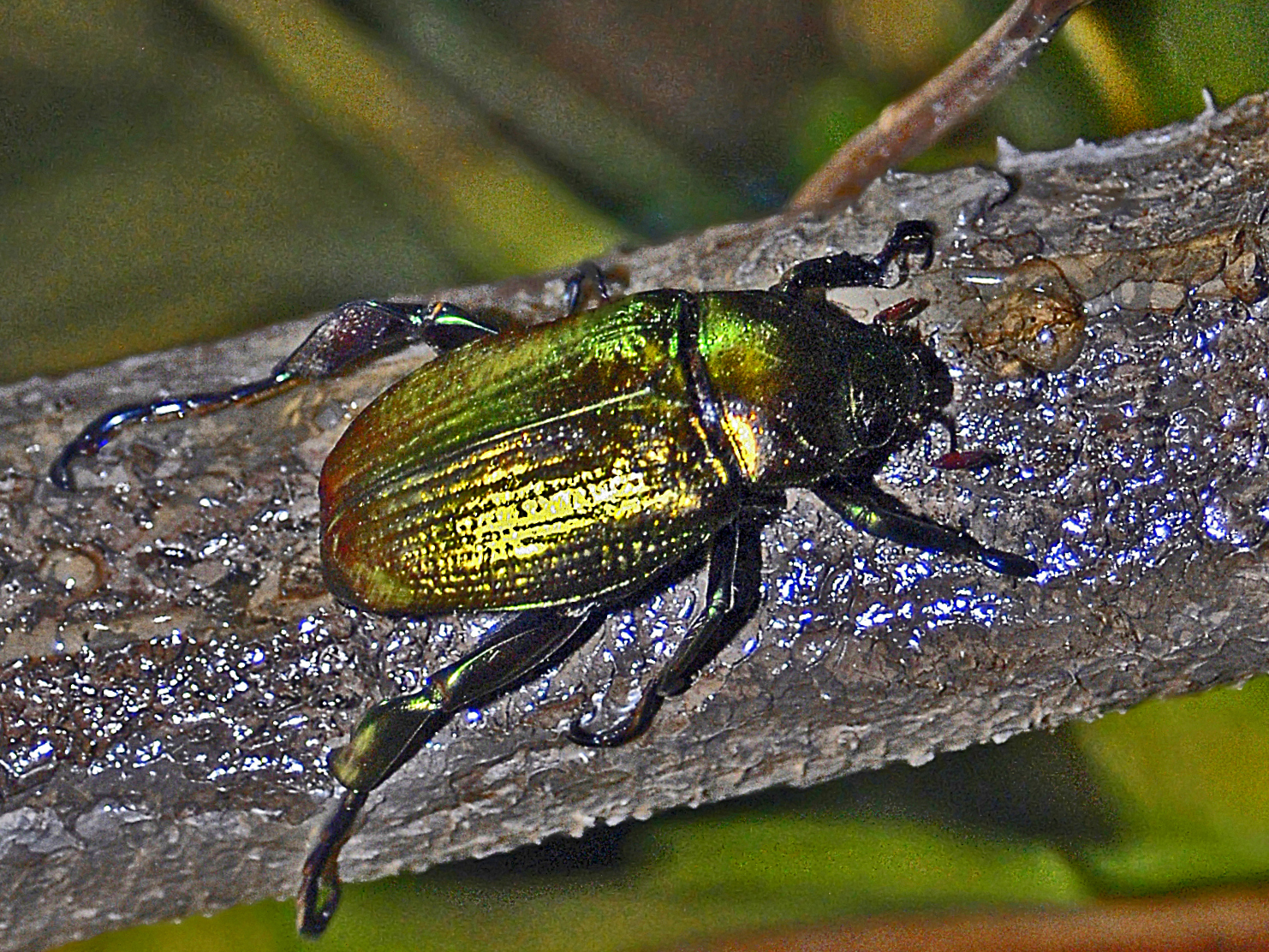
- Chalcoplethis kirbii

Scientific classification
- Kingdom: Animalia
- Phylum: Arthropoda
- Class: Insecta
- Order: Coleoptera
- Suborder: Polyphaga
- Infraorder: Scarabaeiformia
- Family: Scarabaeidae
- Subfamily: Rutelinae
- Tribe: Rutelini
- Subtribe: Rutelina
- Genus: Chalcoplethis; Burmeister, 1844
- Species: C. kirbii

Binomial name
- Chalcoplethis kirbii (Gray, 1832)

Synonyms
- Pelidnota (Chalcoplethis) kirbyi (Gray, 1832); Chalcoplethis kirbyi (Gray, 1832); Chrysophora kirbyi Gray, 1832

= Chalcoplethis =

Species of beetle

Chalcoplethis is a genus in the beetle family Scarabaeidae. This genus has a single species, Chalcoplethis kirbii.

== Subspecies ==
- Chalcoplethis kirbii misionesensis
- Chalcoplethis kirbii kirbii

== Description ==
Chalcoplethis kirbii reaches a length of about 25 millimetres (0.98 in).

== Distribution ==
This species occurs in Brazil, Argentina and Paraguay.
