= Cotalpa conclamara =

Scientific classification
- Kingdom: Animalia
- Phylum: Arthropoda
- Clade: Pancrustacea
- Class: Insecta
- Order: Coleoptera
- Suborder: Polyphaga
- Infraorder: Scarabaeiformia
- Family: Scarabaeidae
- Genus: Cotalpa
- Species: C. conclamara

Binomial name
- Cotalpa conclamara Young, 2002

Species of beetle

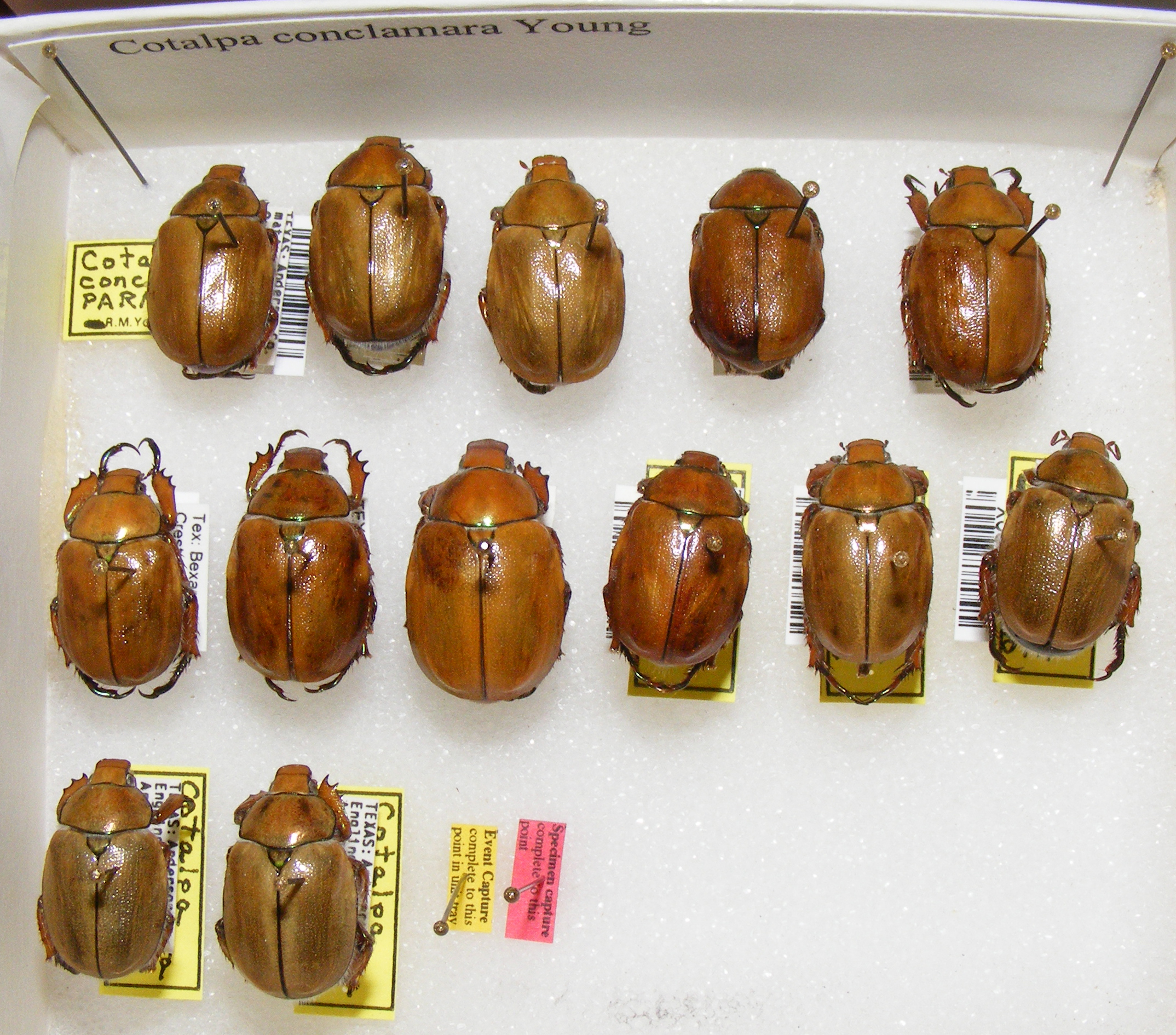

Cotalpa conclamara, the Texas goldsmith beetle, is a species of shining leaf chafer in the family Scarabaeidae.
