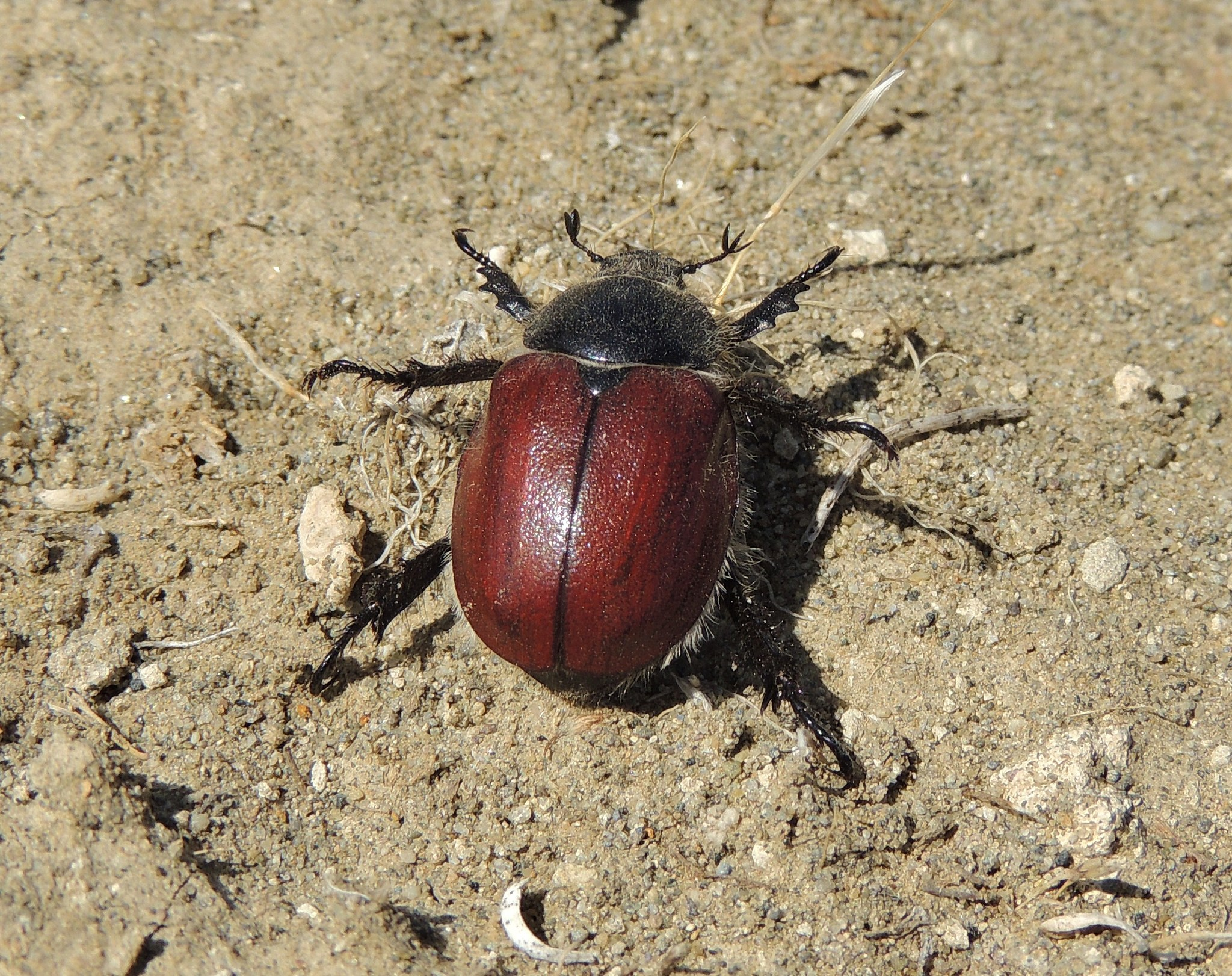

Scientific classification
- Kingdom: Animalia
- Phylum: Arthropoda
- Clade: Pancrustacea
- Class: Insecta
- Order: Coleoptera
- Suborder: Polyphaga
- Infraorder: Scarabaeiformia
- Family: Scarabaeidae
- Genus: Paracotalpa
- Species: P. ursina

Binomial name
- Paracotalpa ursina (Horn, 1867)

Synonyms
- Cotalpa leonina Fall, 1932; Paracotalpa piceola Saylor, 1940; Pocalta brevis Casey, 1915; Pocalta laevicauda Casey, 1915; Pocalta nigripennis Casey, 1915; Pocalta rotunda Casey, 1915; Pocalta rubripennis Casey, 1915; Pocalta seriata Casey, 1915

= Paracotalpa ursina =

Species of beetle

Paracotalpa ursina, also known as the little-bear scarab beetle or simply little bear, is a species of shining leaf chafer in the family of beetles known as Scarabaeidae. It is found in the western United States and Mexico.

== Description ==
Adults range from 10 to 23 millimetres (0.39 to 0.91 in) in length. The head and thorax are black, metallic blue, or metallic green, and the elytra are red-brown or black. The beetle is covered in hairs.

== Subspecies ==
These four subspecies belong to the species Paracotalpa ursina:

- Paracotalpa ursina piceola Saylor, 1940^{c g}
- Paracotalpa ursina rotunda^{b}
- Paracotalpa ursina rubripennis^{b}
- Paracotalpa ursina ursina^{g b}

Data sources: i = ITIS, c = Catalogue of Life, g = GBIF, b = Bugguide.net
