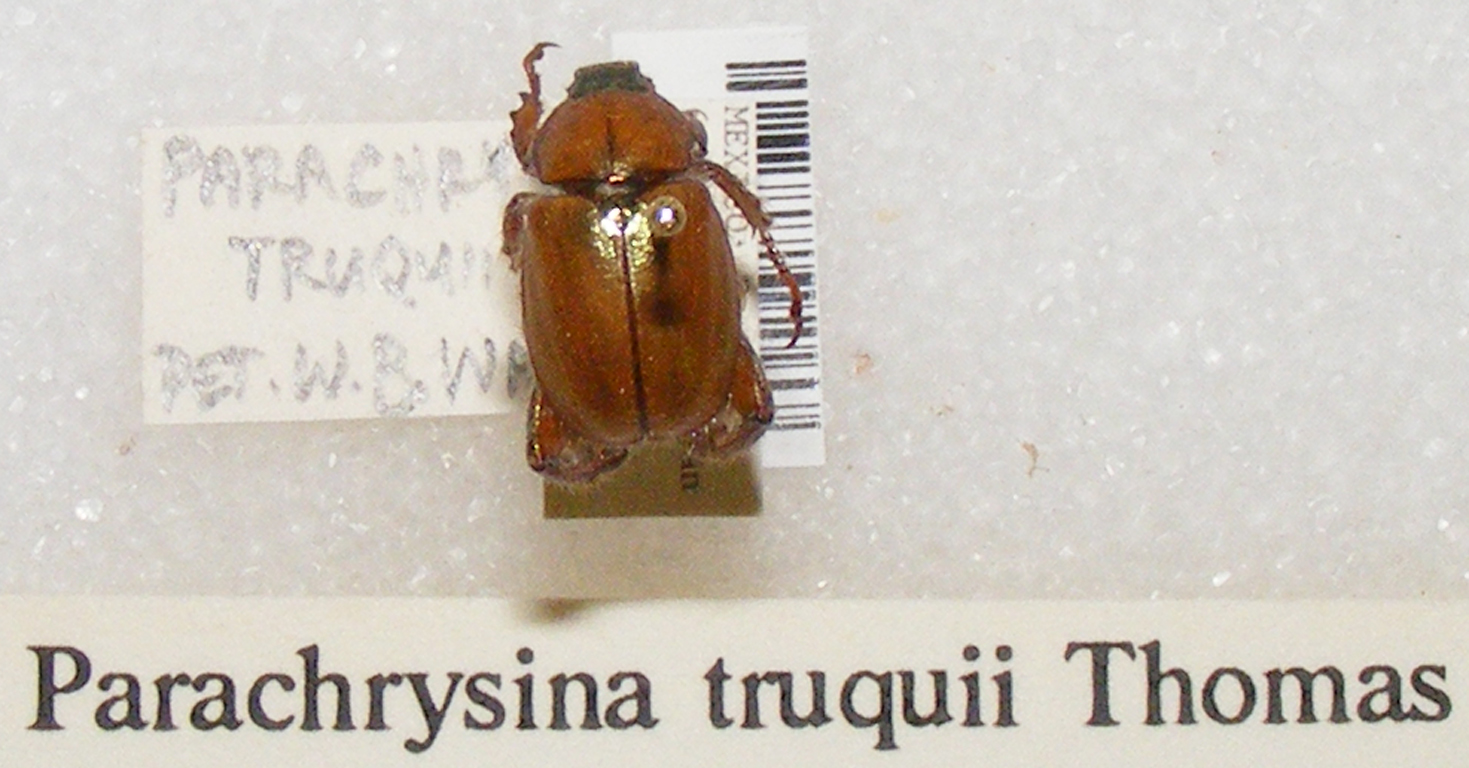
- Parachrysina truquii, adult

Scientific classification
- Kingdom: Animalia
- Phylum: Arthropoda
- Clade: Pancrustacea
- Class: Insecta
- Order: Coleoptera
- Suborder: Polyphaga
- Infraorder: Scarabaeiformia
- Family: Scarabaeidae
- Genus: Parachrysina
- Species: P. truquii

Binomial name
- Parachrysina truquii (Thomson, 1857)

Synonyms
- Chrysina truquii Thomson, 1857; Parachrysina truquii subsp. viridaenea Ohaus, 1935

= Parachrysina truquii =

Species of beetle

Parachrysina truquii is a beetle of the family Scarabaeidae. It is found in Mexico.
