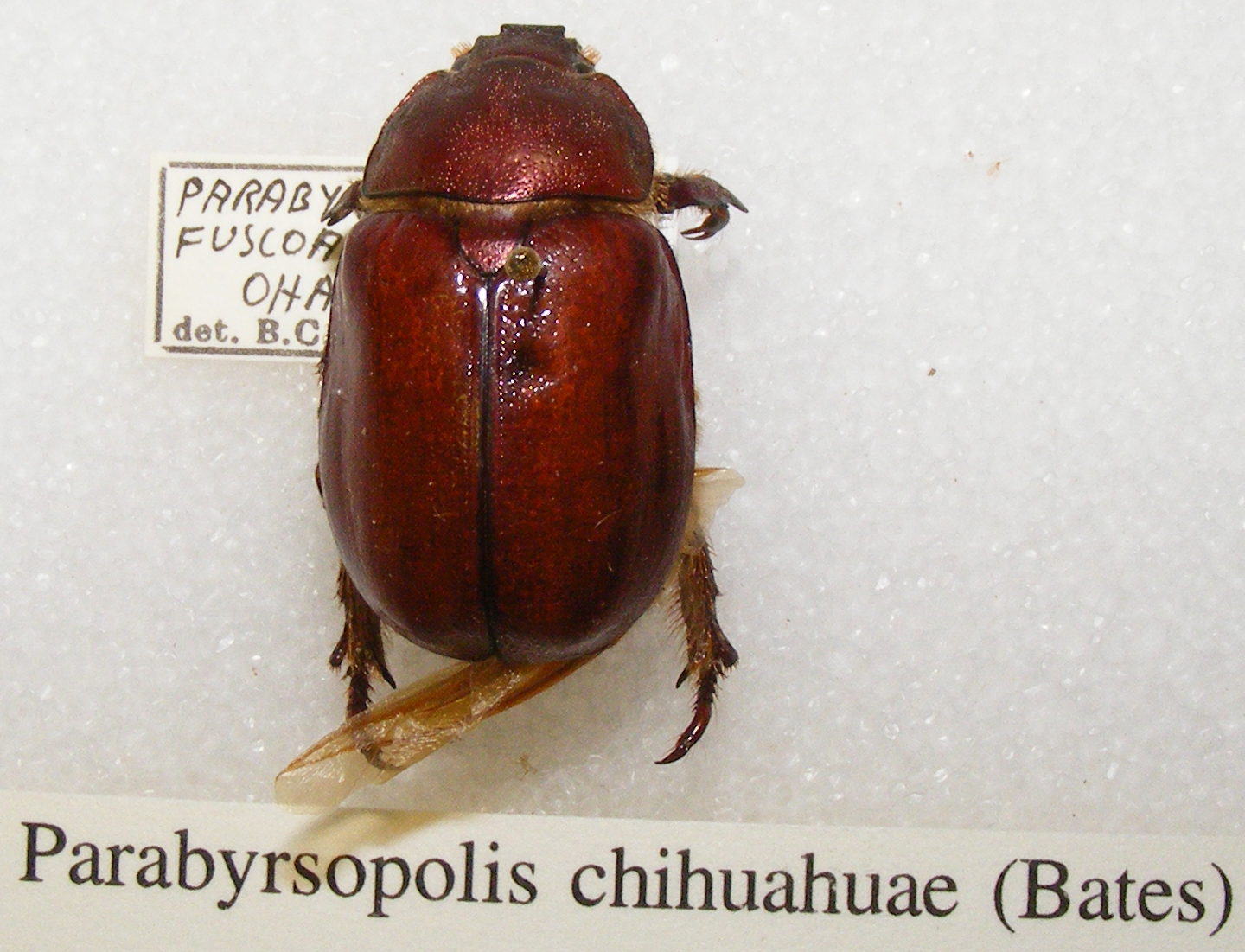
- Parabyrsopolis chihuahuae, adult

Scientific classification
- Domain: Eukaryota
- Kingdom: Animalia
- Phylum: Arthropoda
- Class: Insecta
- Order: Coleoptera
- Suborder: Polyphaga
- Infraorder: Scarabaeiformia
- Family: Scarabaeidae
- Genus: Parabyrsopolis
- Species: P. chihuahuae

Binomial name
- Parabyrsopolis chihuahuae (Bates, 1888)

Synonyms
- Byrsopolis chihuahuae Bates, 1888; Byrsopolis arizonae Ohaus, 1912; Byrsopolis lanigera Bates, 1888; Cotalpa (Parabyrsopolis) batesi Ohaus, 1915; Parareoda rufobrunnea Casey, 1915

= Parabyrsopolis chihuahuae =

Genus of beetles

Parabyrsopolis chihuahuae is a beetle of the family Scarabaeidae.

== Gallery ==
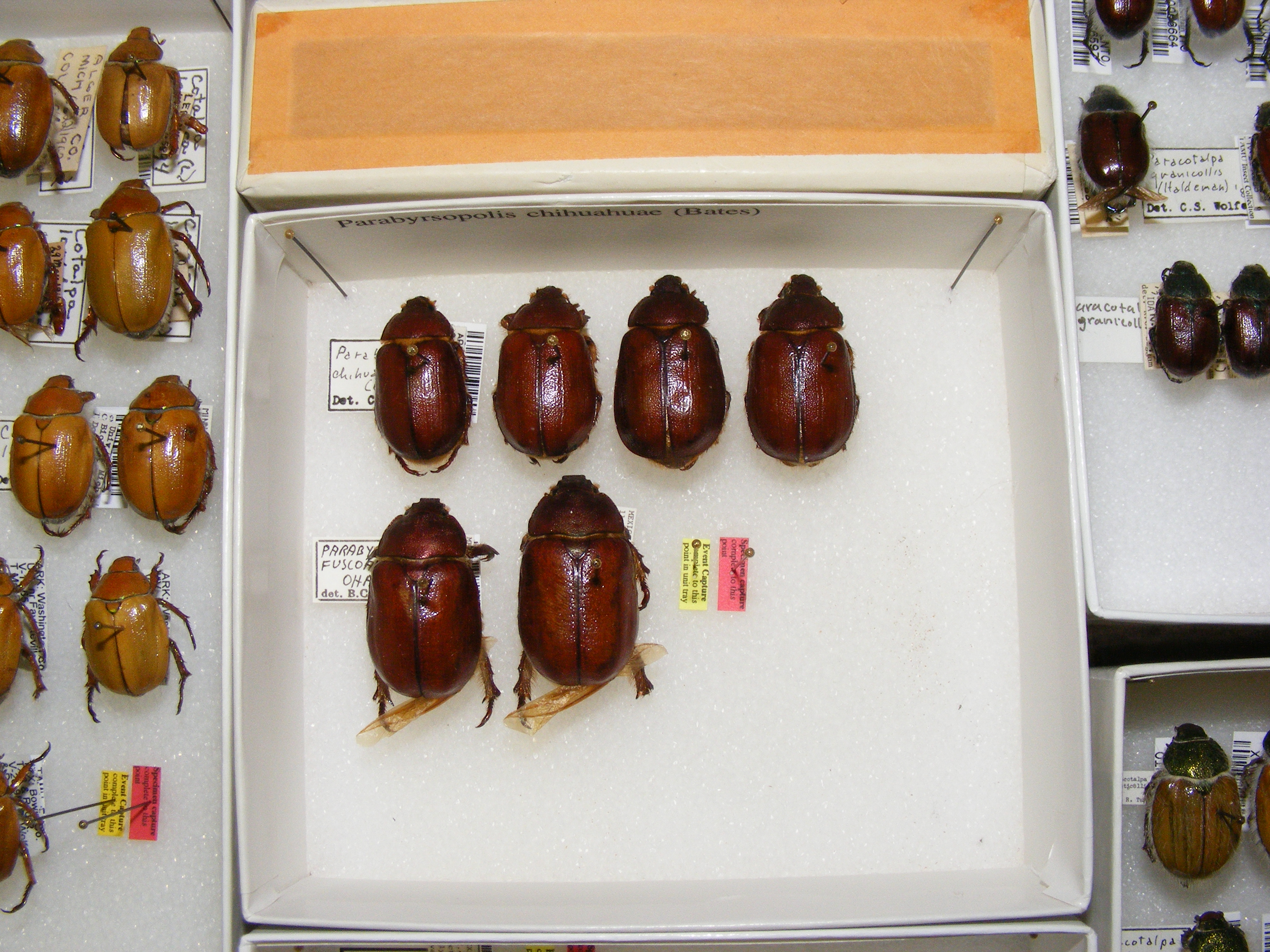
Specimen collection
