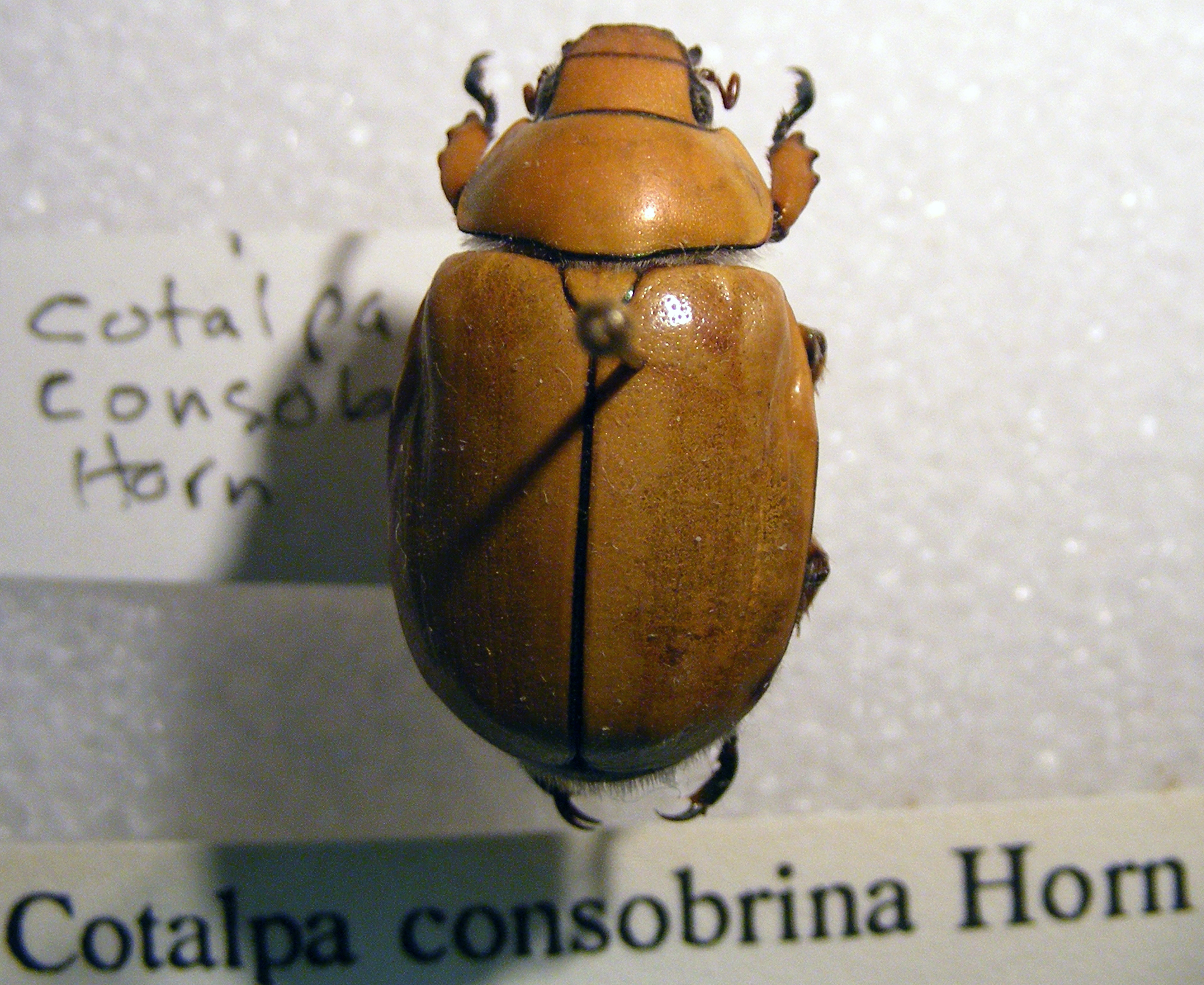
- Cotalpa consobrina, adult

Scientific classification
- Kingdom: Animalia
- Phylum: Arthropoda
- Clade: Pancrustacea
- Class: Insecta
- Order: Coleoptera
- Suborder: Polyphaga
- Infraorder: Scarabaeiformia
- Family: Scarabaeidae
- Genus: Cotalpa
- Species: C. consobrina

Binomial name
- Cotalpa consobrina Horn, 1871

= Cotalpa consobrina =

Species of beetle

Cotalpa consobrina is a beetle of the family Scarabaeidae.

== Gallery ==
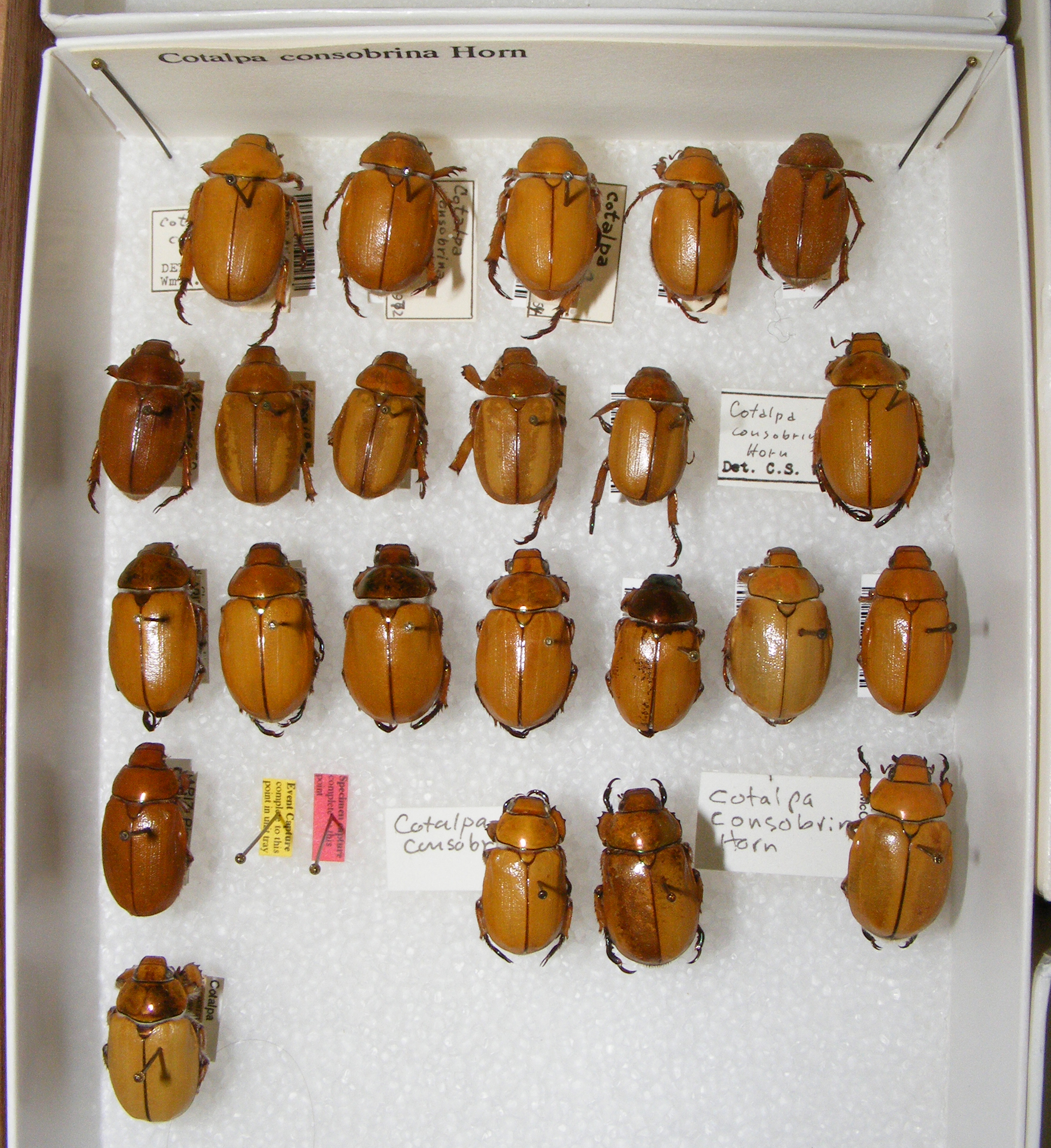
Specimen collection
