= Rutela formosa =

Scientific classification
- Kingdom: Animalia
- Phylum: Arthropoda
- Clade: Pancrustacea
- Class: Insecta
- Order: Coleoptera
- Suborder: Polyphaga
- Infraorder: Scarabaeiformia
- Family: Scarabaeidae
- Genus: Rutela
- Species: R. formosa

Binomial name
- Rutela formosa Burmeister, 1844

Species of beetle

Rutela formosa, the handsome flower scarab, is a species of shining leaf chafer in the family of beetles known as Scarabaeidae.
