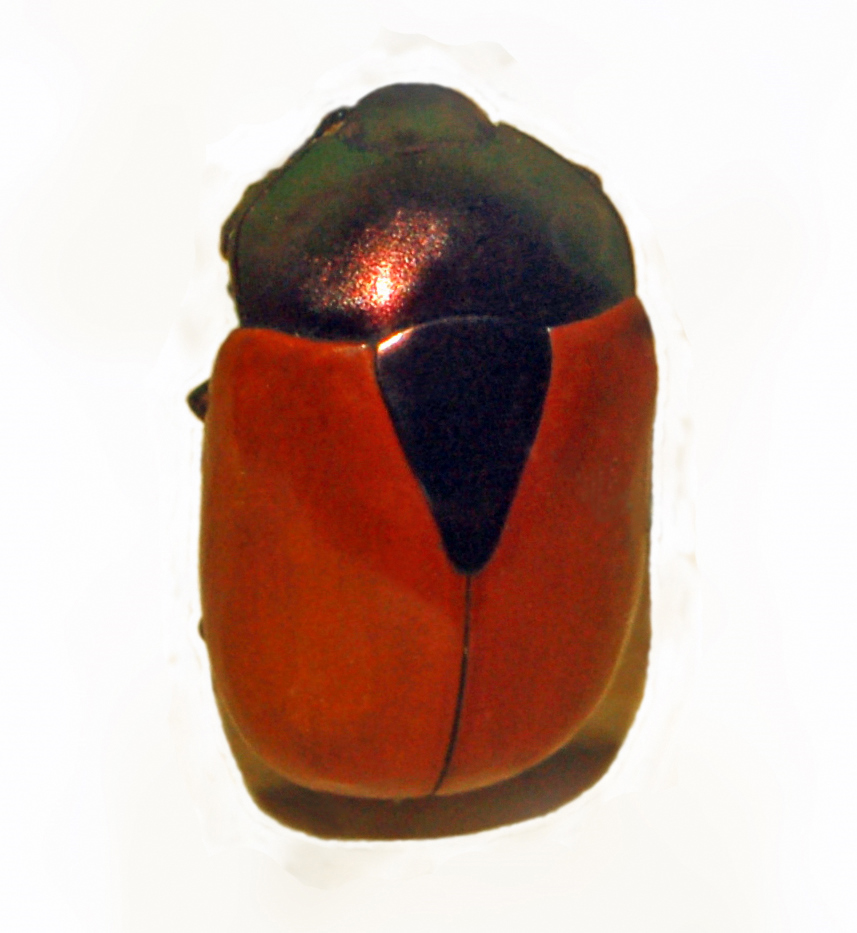
- Macraspis clavata. Museum specimen.

Scientific classification
- Kingdom: Animalia
- Phylum: Arthropoda
- Clade: Pancrustacea
- Class: Insecta
- Order: Coleoptera
- Suborder: Polyphaga
- Infraorder: Scarabaeiformia
- Family: Scarabaeidae
- Genus: Macraspis
- Species: M. clavata

Binomial name
- Macraspis clavata (Olivier, 1789)

= Macraspis clavata =

Species of beetle

Macraspis clavata is a species of beetle of the family Scarabaeidae. It occurs in Brazil. These beetles can reach a length of about 25 millimetres (0.98 in).
