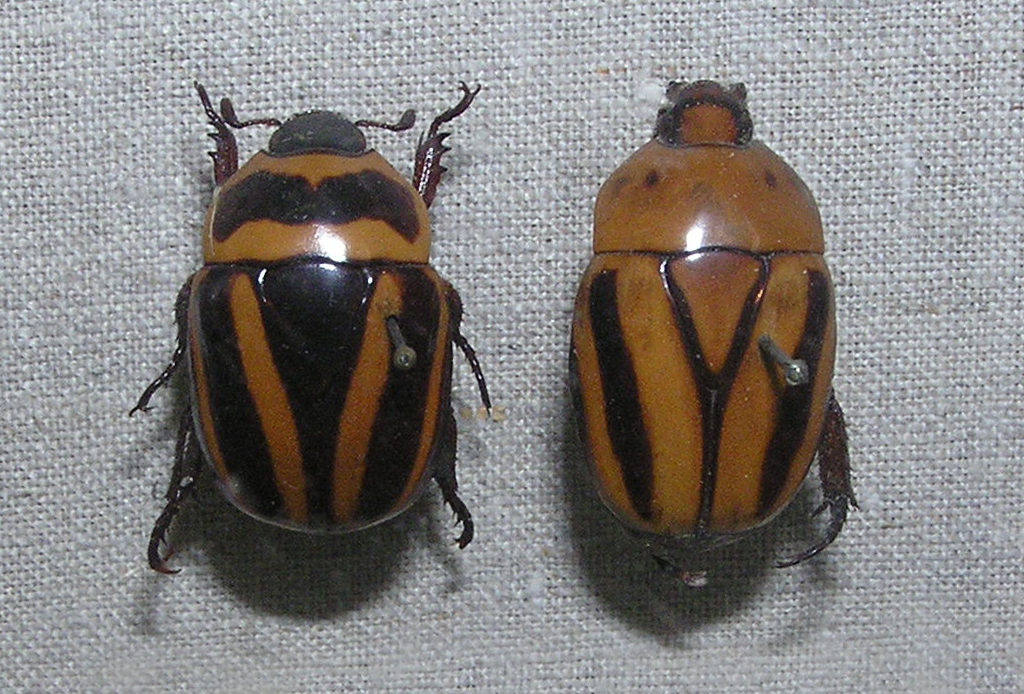
- Macraspis cincta. Museum specimen.

Scientific classification
- Kingdom: Animalia
- Phylum: Arthropoda
- Class: Insecta
- Order: Coleoptera
- Suborder: Polyphaga
- Infraorder: Scarabaeiformia
- Family: Scarabaeidae
- Genus: Macraspis
- Species: M. cincta

Binomial name
- Macraspis cincta (Drury, 1782)

= Macraspis cincta =

Species of beetle

Macraspis cincta is a species of beetles of the family Scarabaeidae.
