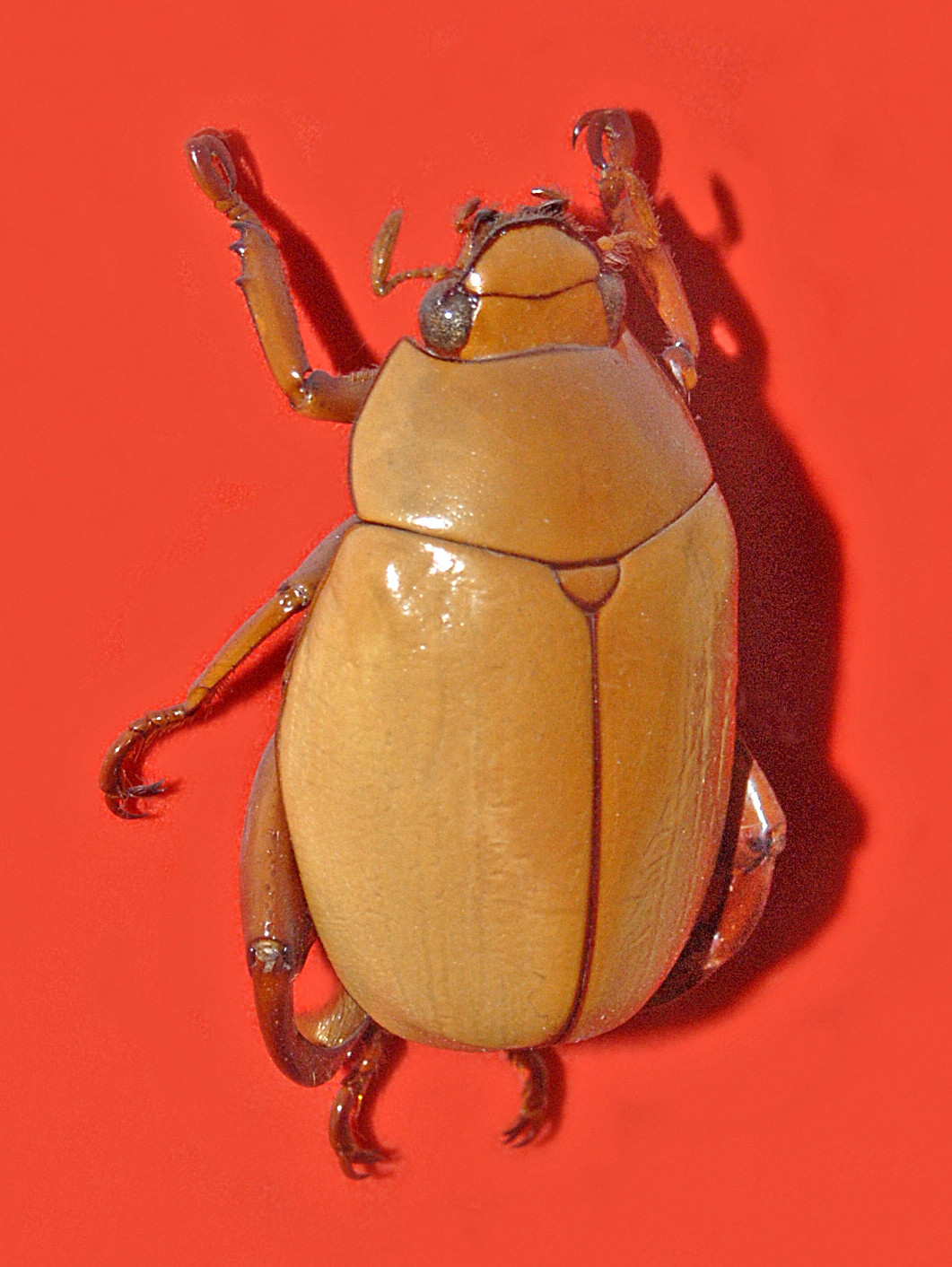
- Museum specimen of Macropoides crassipes

Scientific classification
- Kingdom: Animalia
- Phylum: Arthropoda
- Class: Insecta
- Order: Coleoptera
- Suborder: Polyphaga
- Infraorder: Scarabaeiformia
- Family: Scarabaeidae
- Subfamily: Rutelinae
- Genus: Macropoides; Guérin-Méneville, 1844

= Macropoides =

Genus of beetles

Macropoides is a genus of beetles of the scarab beetle family. These species can be found in Mexico and Central America. They have a flat and broad hind femur.

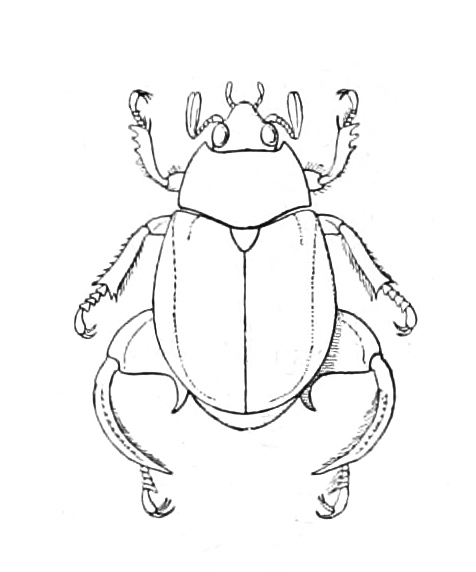
Shape of hind femur in M. nietoi

== Species ==
The genus is placed in the subtribe Heterosternina Bates, 1888. Members of the tribe are known from Mexico and Central America. One genus Promacropoides is found in South America. The genus Plesiosternus has been considered a sister but no molecular phylogeny studies exist.

Species included in the genus include:

- Macropoides crassipes (Horn, 1866)
  - subsp. crassipes
  - subsp. occidentalis Morón, 1987
- Macropoides cribricollis Ohaus, 1934
- Macropoides nietoi (Guérin-Méneville, 1844)
