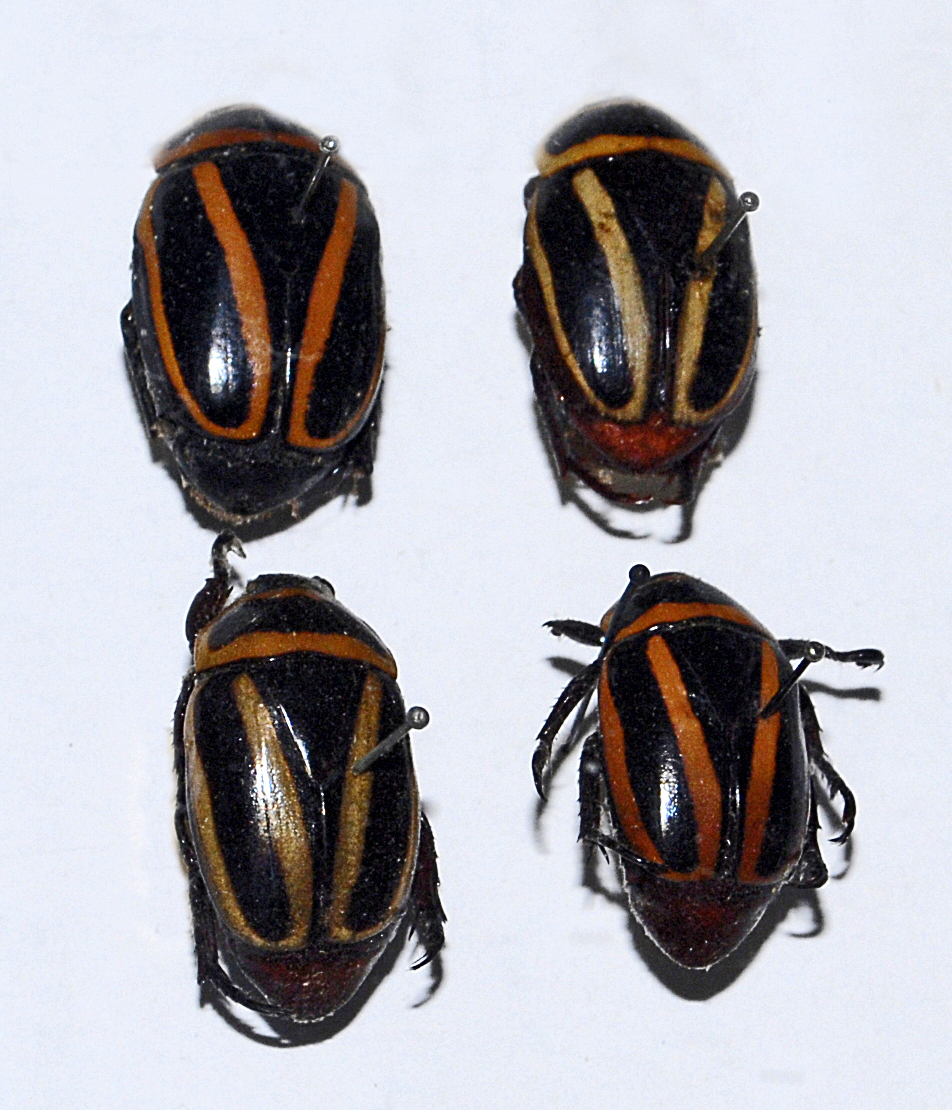
- Macraspis cincta. Museum specimen.

Scientific classification
- Kingdom: Animalia
- Phylum: Arthropoda
- Class: Insecta
- Order: Coleoptera
- Suborder: Polyphaga
- Infraorder: Scarabaeiformia
- Family: Scarabaeidae
- Genus: Macraspis; MacLeay, 1819

= Macraspis =

Genus of beetles

Macraspis is a genus of beetles of the family Scarabaeidae.

== Selected species ==
- Macraspis chloraspis (Laporte de Castelnau, 1840)
- Macraspis cincta (Drury, 1782)
- Macraspis clavata (Olivier, 1789)
- Macraspis elegans (Olsson, 1869)
- Macraspis faurei (Soula)
- Macraspis lateralis (Olivier, 1789)
- Macraspis lucida (Olivier, 1789.)
- Macraspis morio (Burmeister)
- Macraspis oblonga (Burmeister, 1844)
- Macraspis olivieri (Waterhouse, 1881)
- Macraspis pseudochrysis (Landin, 1956)
- Macraspis xanthosticta (Burmeister, 1844)
- Macraspis bivitrata (M'Leay, 1819)
- Macraspis festiva (Burmeister, 1844)
