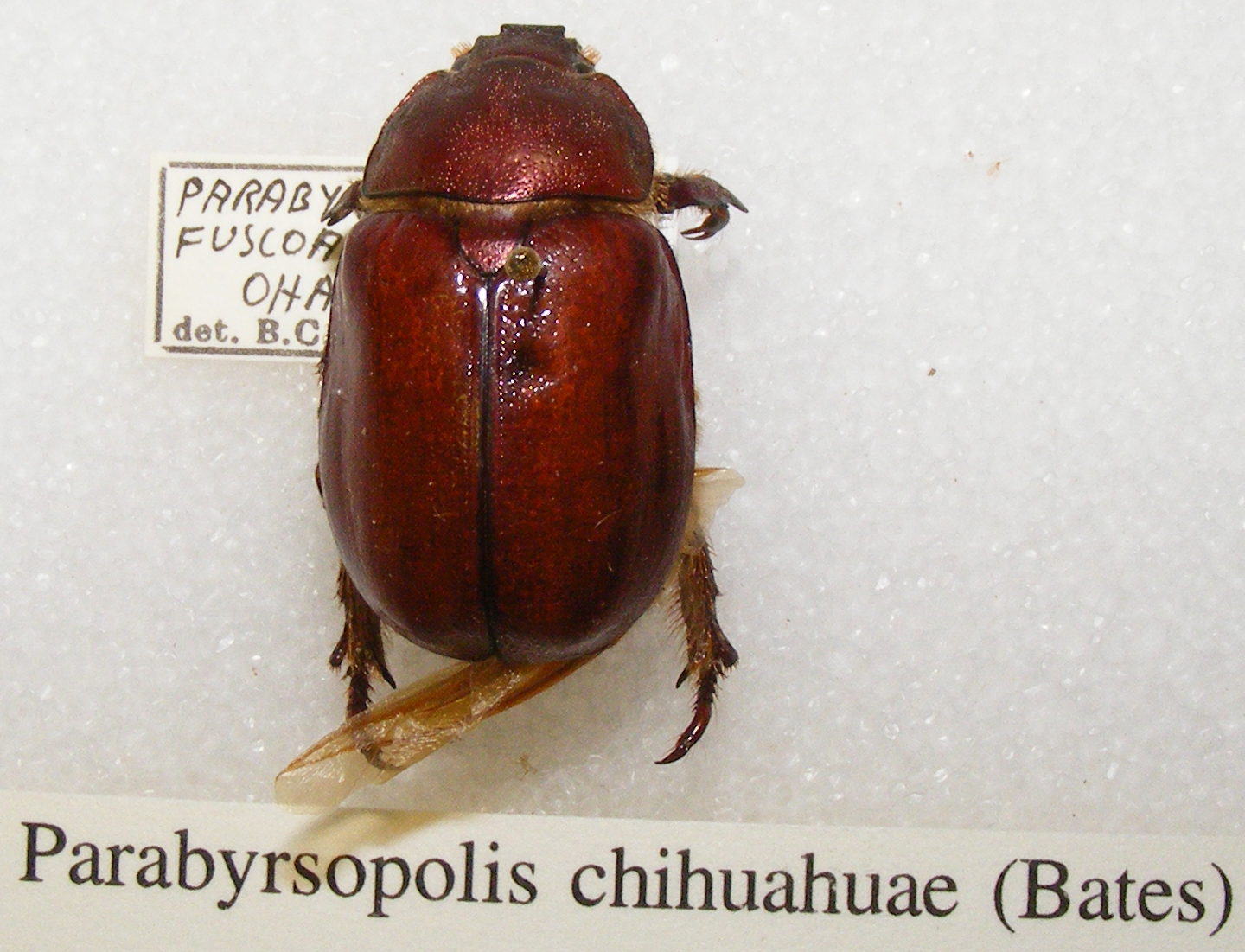
- Parabyrsopolis chihuahuae, adult

Scientific classification
- Kingdom: Animalia
- Phylum: Arthropoda
- Class: Insecta
- Order: Coleoptera
- Suborder: Polyphaga
- Infraorder: Scarabaeiformia
- Family: Scarabaeidae
- Subtribe: Aerodina
- Genus: Parabyrsopolis (Ohaus, 1915)

Species
- Parabyrsopolis chihuahuae; Parabyrsopolis fuscoaenea; Parabyrsopolis villadealendensis; Parabyrsopolis wixaritae

= Parabyrsopolis =

Genus of beetles

Parabyrsopolis is a genus of beetles in the family Scarabaeidae.
