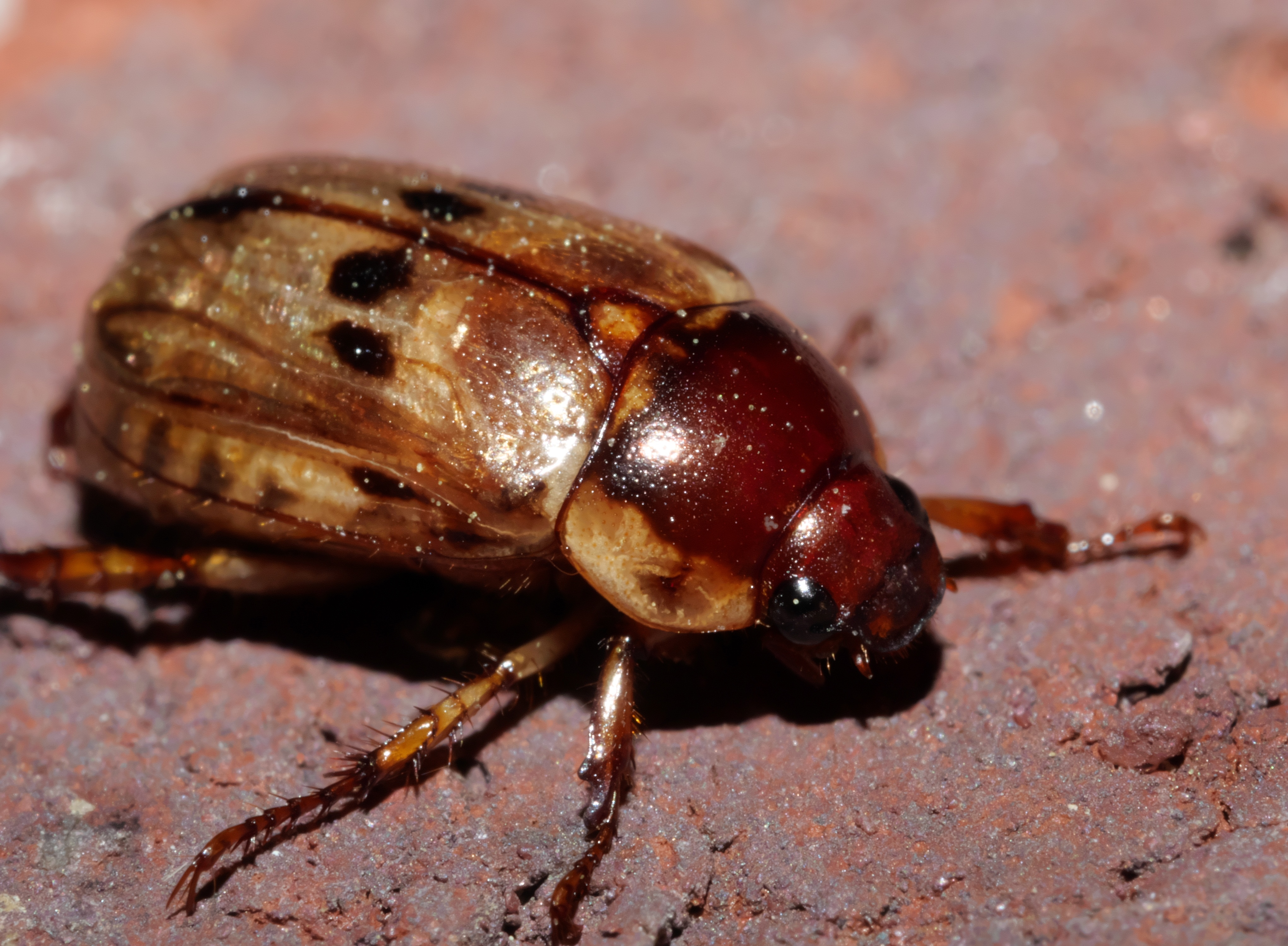
- Anomalacra undulata, Oklahoma

Scientific classification
- Kingdom: Animalia
- Phylum: Arthropoda
- Clade: Pancrustacea
- Class: Insecta
- Order: Coleoptera
- Suborder: Polyphaga
- Infraorder: Scarabaeiformia
- Family: Scarabaeidae
- Subfamily: Rutelinae
- Tribe: Anomalini
- Genus: Anomalacra
- Species: A. undulata

Binomial name
- Anomalacra undulata (Melsheimer, 1845)

Synonyms
- Anomala undulata Melsheimer, 1845

= Anomala undulata =

Species of beetles

Anomalacra undulata is a species of shining leaf chafer in the beetle family Scarabaeidae. It is found in North America east of the Rockies, Central America, and South America.

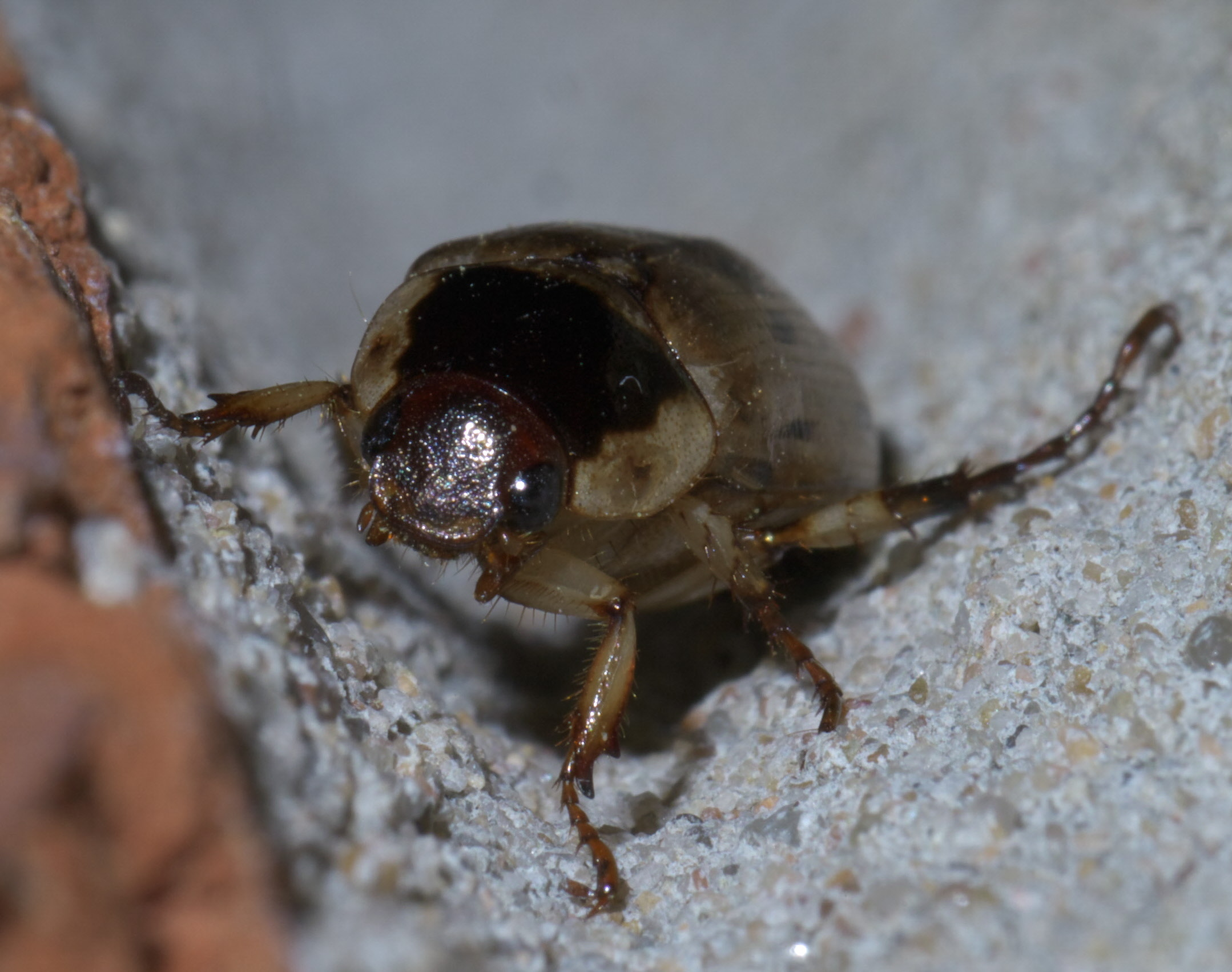

== Subspecies ==
These seven subspecies belong to the species Anomalacra undulata:

- Anomalacra undulata aeneipennis (Blanchard, 1851)
- Anomalacra undulata brasiliensis (Arrow, 1899)
- Anomalacra undulata collaris (Burmeister, 1844)
- Anomalacra undulata espiritosantensis (Ohaus, 1902)
- Anomalacra undulata peruviana (Guérin-Méneville, 1830)
- Anomalacra undulata undulata (Melsheimer, 1845)
- Anomalacra undulata varians (Fabricius, 1801)
