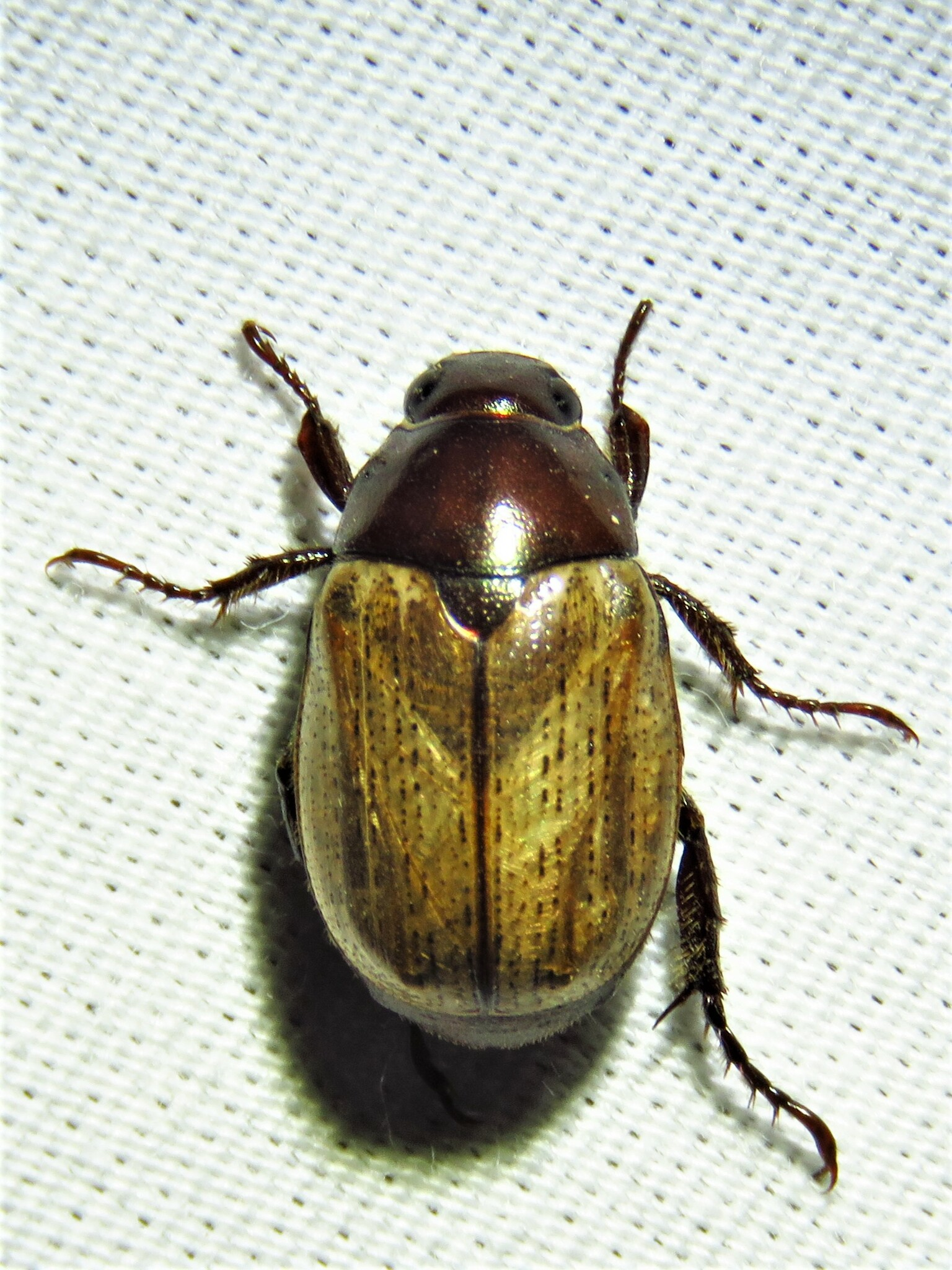
- Anomalacra foraminosa, Texas

Scientific classification
- Kingdom: Animalia
- Phylum: Arthropoda
- Clade: Pancrustacea
- Class: Insecta
- Order: Coleoptera
- Suborder: Polyphaga
- Infraorder: Scarabaeiformia
- Superfamily: Scarabaeoidea
- Family: Scarabaeidae
- Subfamily: Rutelinae
- Tribe: Anomalini
- Genus: Anomalacra
- Species: A. foraminosa

Binomial name
- Anomalacra foraminosa (Bates, 1888)

Synonyms
- Anomala foraminosa Bates, 1888

= Anomalacra foraminosa =

Species of beetles

Anomalacra foraminosa is a species of shining leaf chafer in the scarab beetle family Scarabaeidae. It is found in Mexico and Central America.
