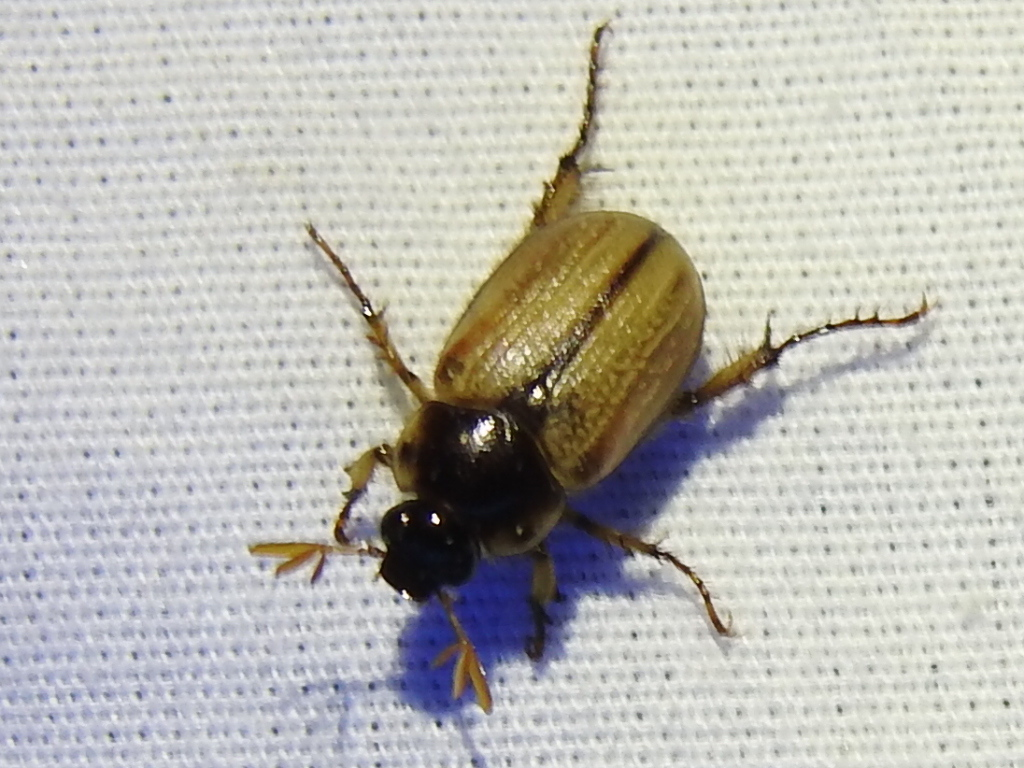
- Anomalacra suavis, Texas

Scientific classification
- Kingdom: Animalia
- Phylum: Arthropoda
- Clade: Pancrustacea
- Class: Insecta
- Order: Coleoptera
- Suborder: Polyphaga
- Infraorder: Scarabaeiformia
- Superfamily: Scarabaeoidea
- Family: Scarabaeidae
- Subfamily: Rutelinae
- Tribe: Anomalini
- Genus: Anomalacra
- Species: A. suavis

Binomial name
- Anomalacra suavis (Potts, 1976)

= Anomalacra suavis =

Species of beetles

Anomalacra suavis is a species of shining leaf chafer in the scarab beetle family Scarabaeidae. It is found mainly in New Mexico and Texas.
