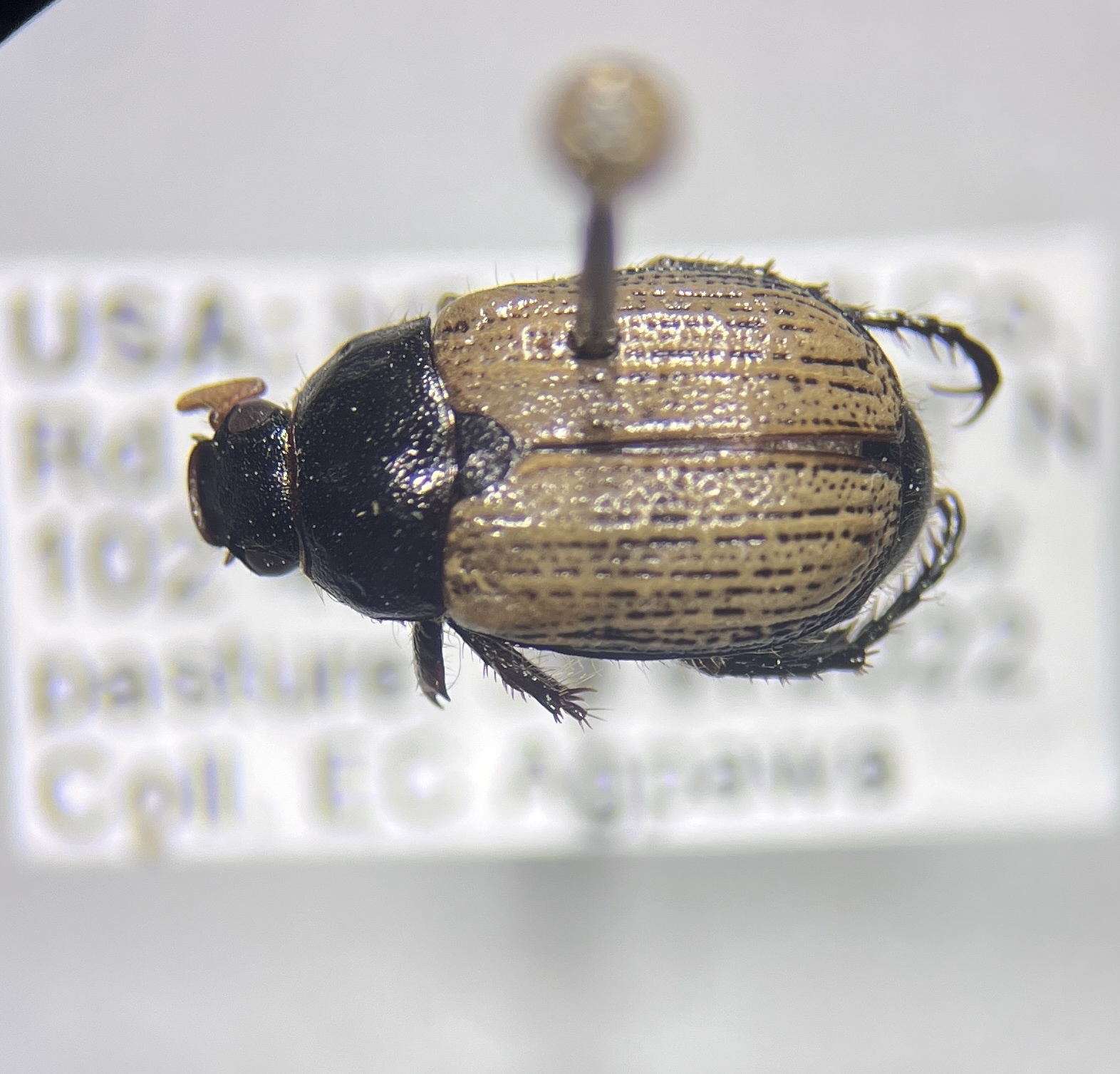
- Anomalacra ludoviciana, Nebraska

Scientific classification
- Kingdom: Animalia
- Phylum: Arthropoda
- Clade: Pancrustacea
- Class: Insecta
- Order: Coleoptera
- Suborder: Polyphaga
- Infraorder: Scarabaeiformia
- Superfamily: Scarabaeoidea
- Family: Scarabaeidae
- Subfamily: Rutelinae
- Tribe: Anomalini
- Genus: Anomalacra
- Species: A. ludoviciana

Binomial name
- Anomalacra ludoviciana (Schaeffer, 1906)

Synonyms
- Anomala ludoviciana Schaeffer, 1906

= Anomalacra ludoviciana =

Species of beetles

Anomalacra ludoviciana is a species of shining leaf chafer in the scarab beetle family Scarabaeidae. It is found in North and Central America.
