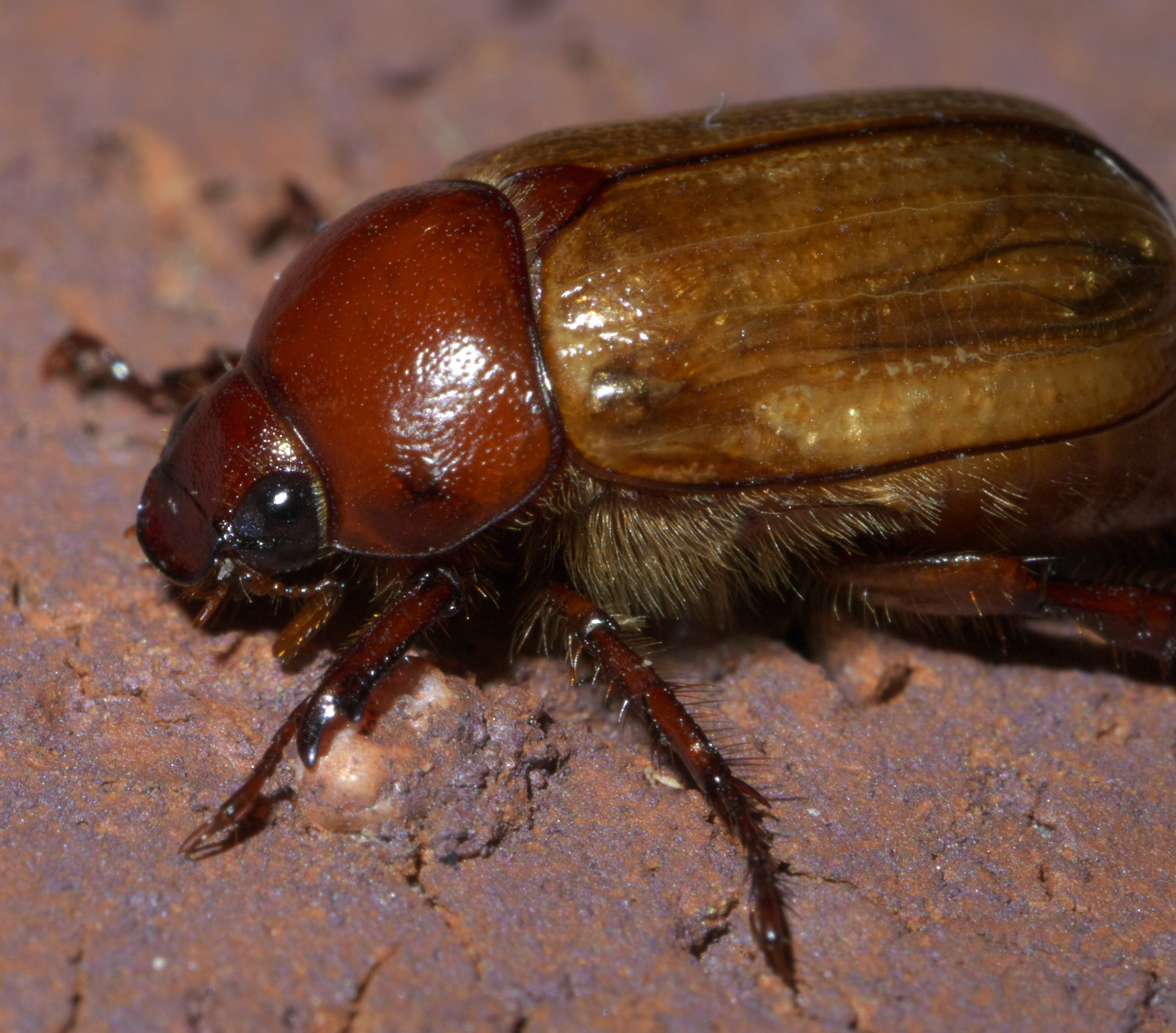
- Anomalacra flavipennis, Oklahoma

Scientific classification
- Kingdom: Animalia
- Phylum: Arthropoda
- Clade: Pancrustacea
- Class: Insecta
- Order: Coleoptera
- Suborder: Polyphaga
- Infraorder: Scarabaeiformia
- Family: Scarabaeidae
- Subfamily: Rutelinae
- Tribe: Anomalini
- Genus: Anomalacra
- Species: A. flavipennis

Binomial name
- Anomalacra flavipennis Burmeister, 1844

Synonyms
- Anomala flavipennis Burmeister, 1844

= Anomalacra flavipennis =

Species of beetles

Anomalacra flavipennis is a species of shining leaf chafer in the family Scarabaeidae. It is found in North America east of the Rocky Mountains, and Central America.

== Subspecies ==
These subspecies belong to the species Anomalacra flavipennis:

- Anomalacra flavipennis aransas (Potts, 1977)
- Anomalacra flavipennis flavipennis (Burmeister, 1844)
- Anomalacra flavipennis luteipennis (LeConte, 1854)
- Anomalacra flavipennis okaloosensis (Potts, 1977)
