= Shining leaf chafer =

Shining leaf chafer may refer to:

- Anomala binotata, a scarab beetle in the family Scarabaeidae
- Rutelinae, a subfamily of the scarab beetle family Scarabaeidae
