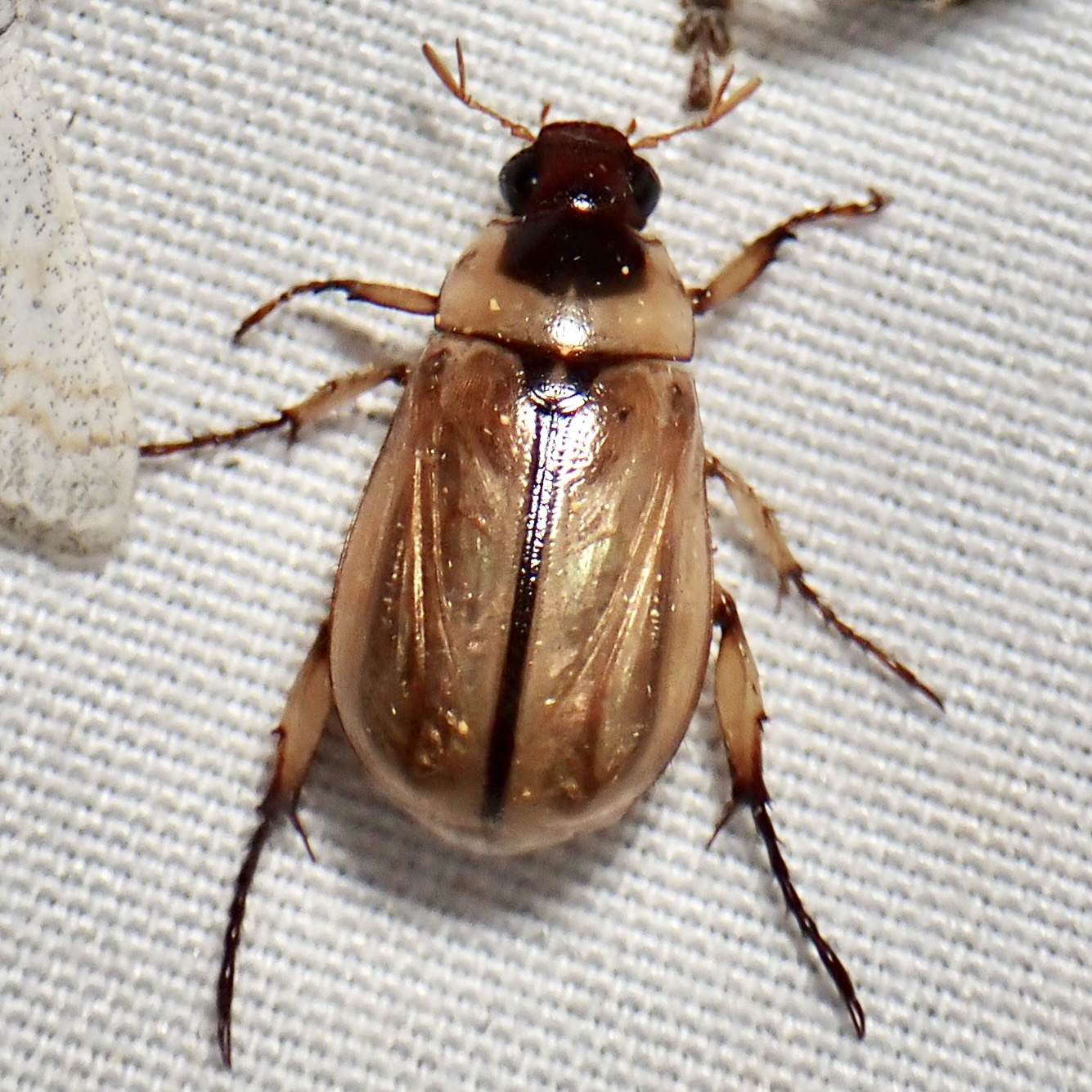
- Anomalacra delicata, Arizona

Scientific classification
- Kingdom: Animalia
- Phylum: Arthropoda
- Clade: Pancrustacea
- Class: Insecta
- Order: Coleoptera
- Suborder: Polyphaga
- Infraorder: Scarabaeiformia
- Superfamily: Scarabaeoidea
- Family: Scarabaeidae
- Subfamily: Rutelinae
- Tribe: Anomalini
- Genus: Anomalacra
- Species: A. delicata

Binomial name
- Anomalacra delicata (Casey, 1915)

Synonyms
- Anomala (Paranomala) delicata Casey, 1915; Anomala (Paranomala) moquina Casey, 1915; Anomala (Paranomala) papagoana Casey, 1915

= Anomalacra delicata =

Species of beetles

Anomalacra delicata is a species of shining leaf chafer in the scarab beetle family Scarabaeidae. It is found in the southwestern United States and northern Mexico.
