= Anomalacra antennata =

Scientific classification
- Kingdom: Animalia
- Phylum: Arthropoda
- Clade: Pancrustacea
- Class: Insecta
- Order: Coleoptera
- Suborder: Polyphaga
- Infraorder: Scarabaeiformia
- Superfamily: Scarabaeoidea
- Family: Scarabaeidae
- Subfamily: Rutelinae
- Tribe: Anomalini
- Genus: Anomalacra
- Species: A. antennata

Binomial name
- Anomalacra antennata (Schaeffer, 1906)

Synonyms
- Anomala antennata Schaeffer, 1906

Species of beetles

Anomalacra antennata is a species of shining leaf chafer in the scarab beetle family Scarabaeidae. It is found in the southwestern United States and northern Mexico.
