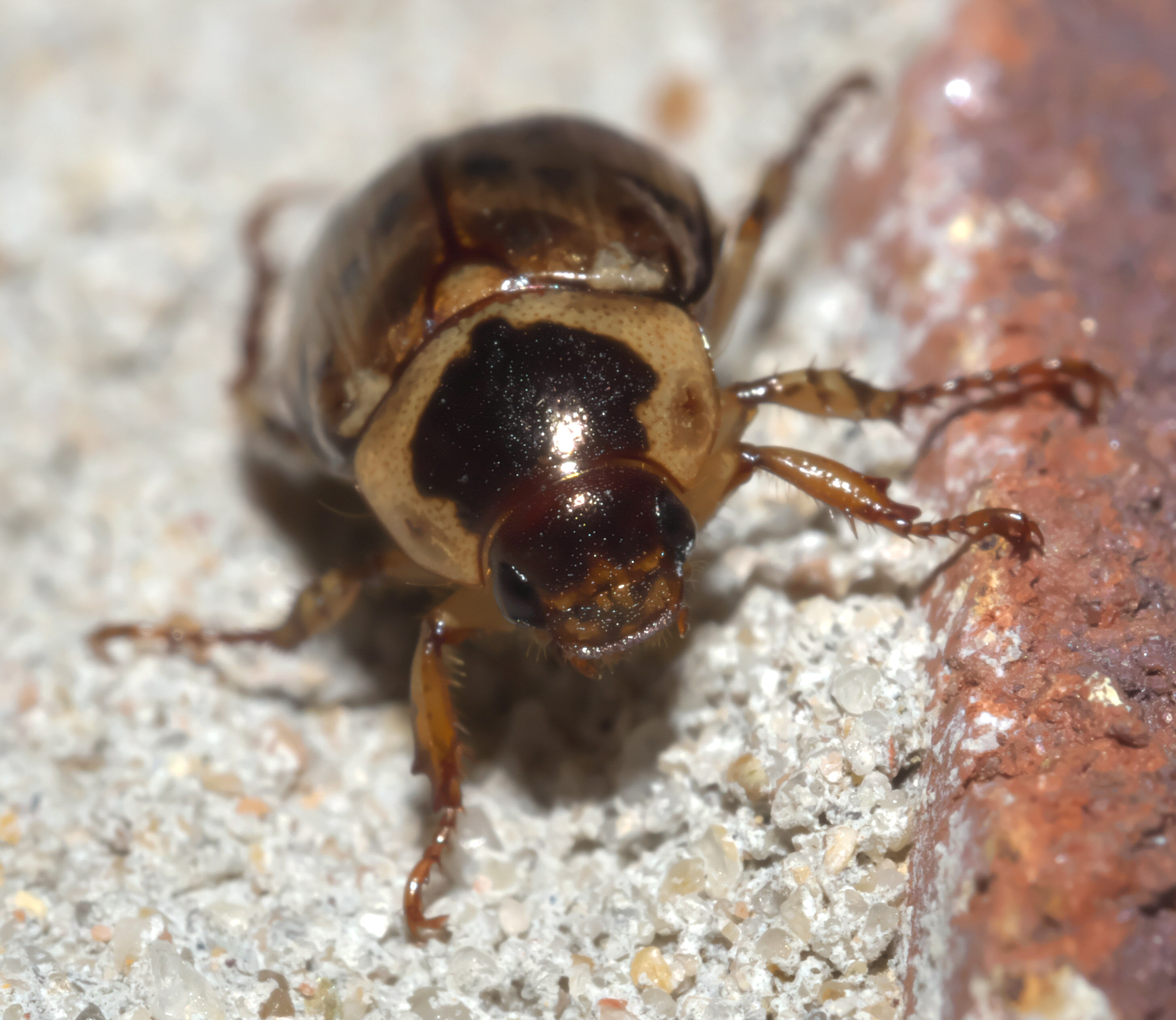
- Anomalacra innuba, Oklahoma

Scientific classification
- Kingdom: Animalia
- Phylum: Arthropoda
- Clade: Pancrustacea
- Class: Insecta
- Order: Coleoptera
- Suborder: Polyphaga
- Infraorder: Scarabaeiformia
- Family: Scarabaeidae
- Subfamily: Rutelinae
- Tribe: Anomalini
- Genus: Anomalacra
- Species: A. innuba

Binomial name
- Anomalacra innuba (Fabricius, 1787)

Synonyms
- Anomala (Paranomala) innuba Casey, 1915; Anomala (Paranomala) innuba piceola Casey, 1915; Anomala (Paranomala) medorensis Casey, 1915; Melolontha innuba Fabricius, 1787

= Anomalacra innuba =

Species of beetles

Anomalacra innuba is a species of shining leaf chafer in the beetle family Scarabaeidae. It is found in the United States, mainly east of the Rocky Mountains.
