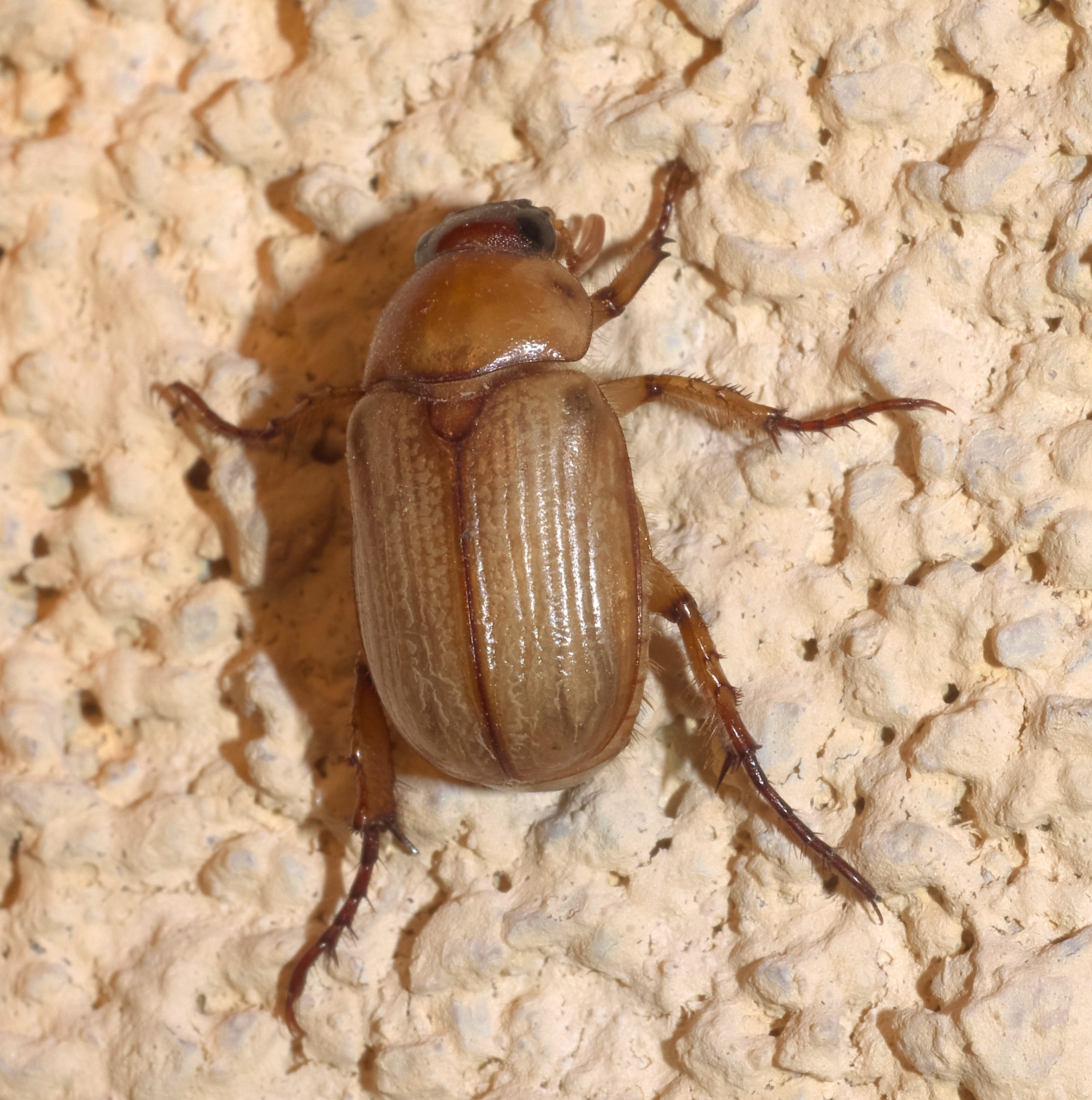
- Anomalacra cavifrons, New Mexico

Scientific classification
- Kingdom: Animalia
- Phylum: Arthropoda
- Clade: Pancrustacea
- Class: Insecta
- Order: Coleoptera
- Suborder: Polyphaga
- Infraorder: Scarabaeiformia
- Family: Scarabaeidae
- Subfamily: Rutelinae
- Tribe: Anomalini
- Genus: Anomalacra
- Species: A. cavifrons

Binomial name
- Anomalacra cavifrons LeConte, 1867

Synonyms
- Anomala cavifrons LeConte, 1868; Anomala apacheana Wickham, 1913; Rhombonalia cochiseana Casey, 1915; Rhombonalia comes Casey, 1915; Rhombonalia transversa Casey, 1915

= Anomalacra cavifrons =

Species of beetles

Anomalacra cavifrons is a species of shining leaf chafer in the beetle family Scarabaeidae. It is found in the south-central United States and Northern Mexico.
