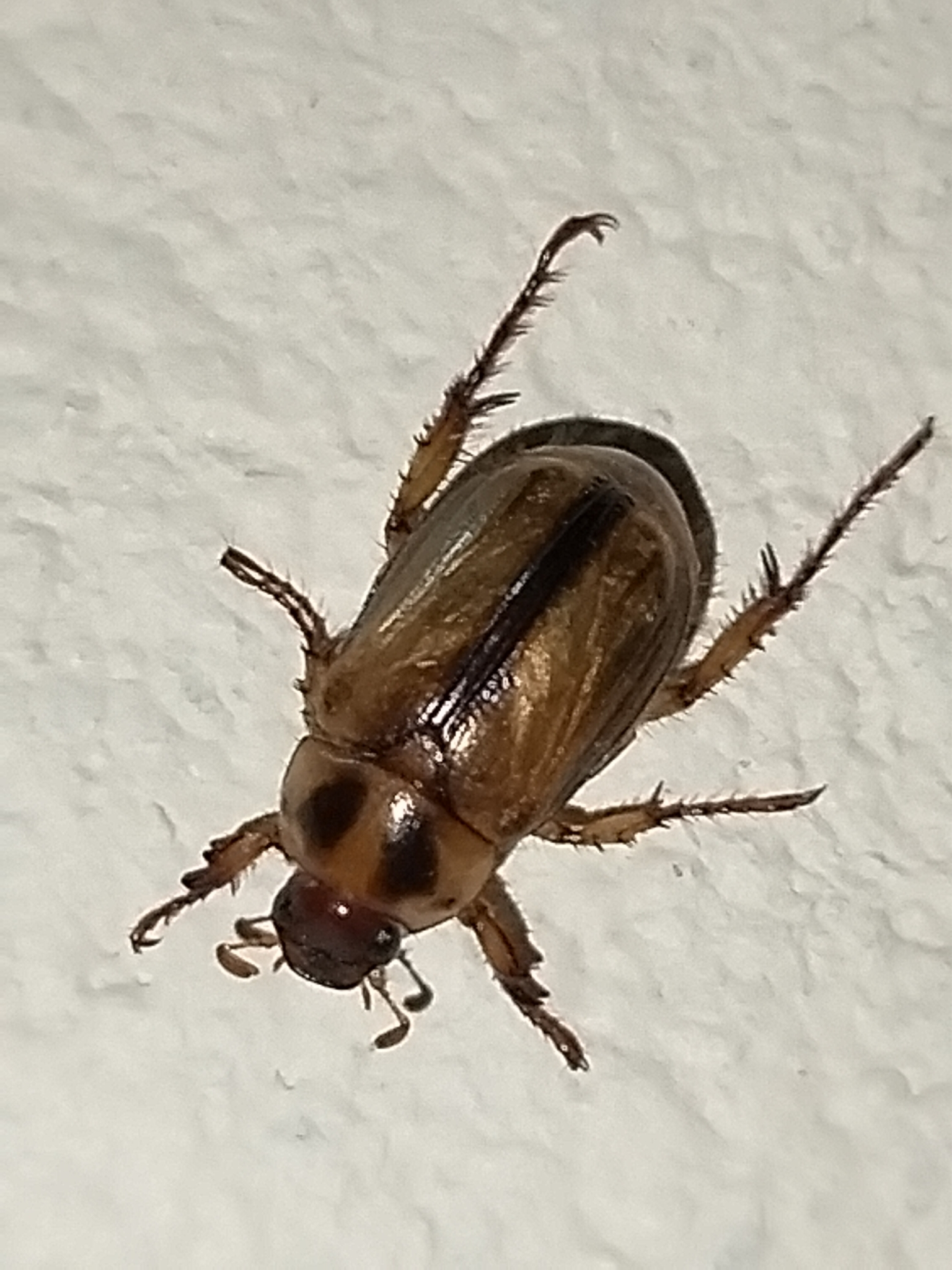
- Anomalacra flavilla, México

Scientific classification
- Kingdom: Animalia
- Phylum: Arthropoda
- Clade: Pancrustacea
- Class: Insecta
- Order: Coleoptera
- Suborder: Polyphaga
- Infraorder: Scarabaeiformia
- Superfamily: Scarabaeoidea
- Family: Scarabaeidae
- Subfamily: Rutelinae
- Tribe: Anomalini
- Genus: Anomalacra
- Species: A. flavilla

Binomial name
- Anomalacra flavilla (Bates, 1888)

Synonyms
- Anomala flavilla Bates, 1888

= Anomalacra flavilla =

Species of beetles

Anomalacra flavilla is a species of shining leaf chafer in the scarab beetle family Scarabaeidae. It is found in the southwest United States and Mexico.

== Subspecies ==
These two subspecies belong to the species Anomalacra flavilla:

- Anomalacra flavilla coachellae (Potts, 1977)
- Anomalacra flavilla flavilla (Bates, 1888)
