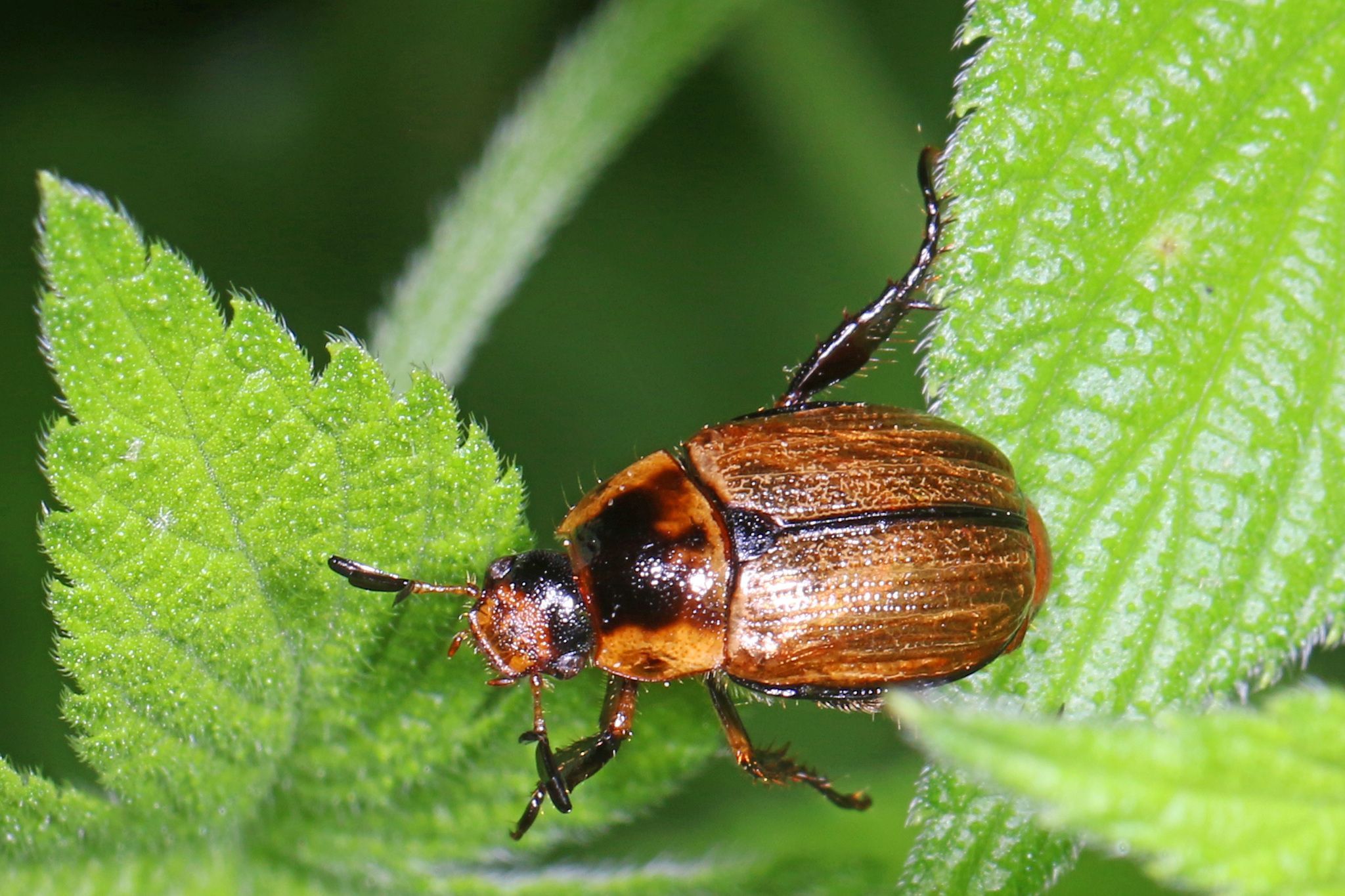
- Anomalacra lucicola, Virginia

Scientific classification
- Kingdom: Animalia
- Phylum: Arthropoda
- Clade: Pancrustacea
- Class: Insecta
- Order: Coleoptera
- Suborder: Polyphaga
- Infraorder: Scarabaeiformia
- Superfamily: Scarabaeoidea
- Family: Scarabaeidae
- Subfamily: Rutelinae
- Tribe: Anomalini
- Genus: Anomalacra
- Species: A. lucicola

Binomial name
- Anomalacra lucicola (Fabricius, 1798)

Synonyms
- Anomala lucicola (Fabricius, 1798); Anomala alterata Arrow, 1915; Anomala phylloperthoides Nonfried, 1894; Anomala pinicola Melsheimer, 1845; Euchlora nigritula Laporte, 1840; Melolontha atrata Fabricius, 1798; Melolontha lucicola Fabricius, 1798; Melolontha moerens Fabricius, 1798; Melolontha quadrimaculata Drapiez, 1821

= Anomalacra lucicola =

Species of beetles

Anomalacra lucicola is a species of shining leaf chafer in the scarab beetle family Scarabaeidae. It is found in North America.
