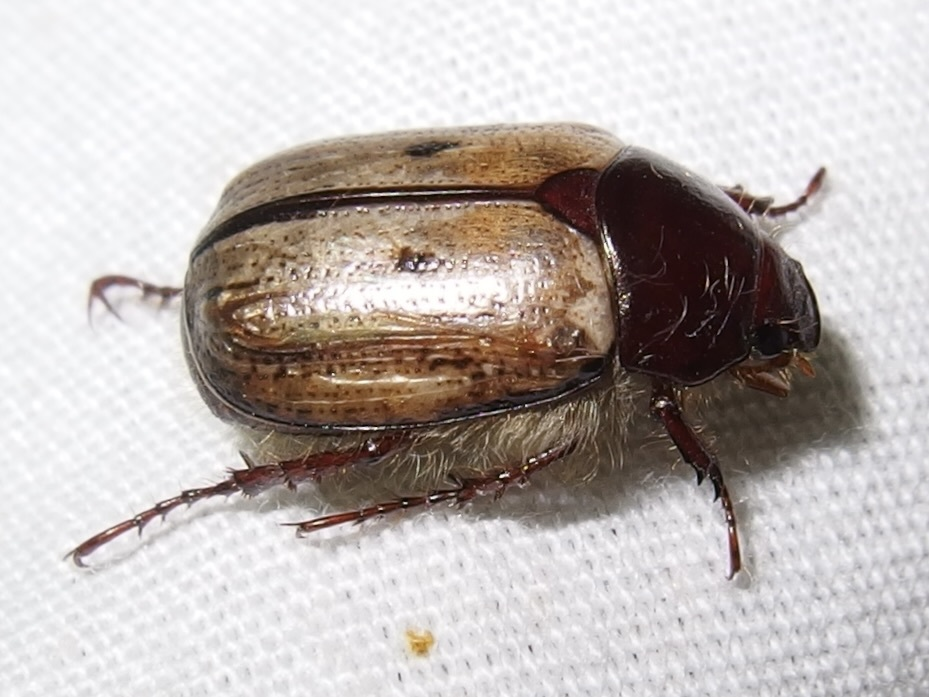
- Anomalacra ellipsis, México

Scientific classification
- Kingdom: Animalia
- Phylum: Arthropoda
- Clade: Pancrustacea
- Class: Insecta
- Order: Coleoptera
- Suborder: Polyphaga
- Infraorder: Scarabaeiformia
- Superfamily: Scarabaeoidea
- Family: Scarabaeidae
- Subfamily: Rutelinae
- Tribe: Anomalini
- Genus: Anomalacra
- Species: A. ellipsis

Binomial name
- Anomalacra ellipsis (Casey), 1915

Synonyms
- Anomala (Paranomala) ellipsis Casey, 1915

= Anomalacra ellipsis =

Species of beetles

Anomalacra ellipsis is a species of shining leaf chafer in the scarab beetle family Scarabaeidae. It is found mainly in the southwestern United States.
