= Anomalacra oblivia =

Scientific classification
- Kingdom: Animalia
- Phylum: Arthropoda
- Clade: Pancrustacea
- Class: Insecta
- Order: Coleoptera
- Suborder: Polyphaga
- Infraorder: Scarabaeiformia
- Superfamily: Scarabaeoidea
- Family: Scarabaeidae
- Subfamily: Rutelinae
- Tribe: Anomalini
- Genus: Anomalacra
- Species: A. oblivia

Binomial name
- Anomalacra oblivia (Horn, 1884)

Synonyms
- Anomala oblivia Horn, 1884; Spilota (Hemispilota) oblivia maritima Casey, 1915

Species of beetles

Anomalacra oblivia is a species of shining leaf chafer in the scarab beetle family Scarabaeidae. It is found in eastern North America.
