= Anomalacra hardyorum =

Scientific classification
- Kingdom: Animalia
- Phylum: Arthropoda
- Clade: Pancrustacea
- Class: Insecta
- Order: Coleoptera
- Suborder: Polyphaga
- Infraorder: Scarabaeiformia
- Superfamily: Scarabaeoidea
- Family: Scarabaeidae
- Subfamily: Rutelinae
- Tribe: Anomalini
- Genus: Anomalacra
- Species: A. hardyorum

Binomial name
- Anomalacra hardyorum (Potts, 1976)

Synonyms
- Anomala hardyorum Potts, 1976

Species of beetles

Anomalacra hardyorum is a species of shining leaf chafer in the scarab beetle family Scarabaeidae. It is endemic to the Algodones Dunes in Southern California.
