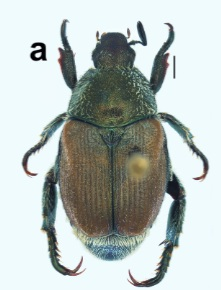

Scientific classification
- Kingdom: Animalia
- Phylum: Arthropoda
- Class: Insecta
- Order: Coleoptera
- Suborder: Polyphaga
- Infraorder: Scarabaeiformia
- Family: Scarabaeidae
- Subfamily: Rutelinae
- Tribe: Anomalini
- Subtribe: Anomalina
- Genus: Lamoana; Casey, 1915
- Species: L. villosella

Binomial name
- Lamoana villosella (Blanchard, 1851)

Synonyms
- Phyllopertha villosella Blanchard, 1851; Strigoderma hirsuta Nonfried, 1893

= Lamoana villosella =

Species of beetle

Lamoana is a genus of shining leaf chafers in the family Scarabaeidae, containing one described species, Lamoana villosella, which is found in the north-central part of Mexico (Colima, Guerrero, Jalisco, Morelos, Oaxaca and Puebla, extending north to the state of Durango). It inhabits dry and tropical forests at altitudes between 0 and 1500 meters.

== Description ==
Adults reach a length of about 7.6–9.22 mm. The colour of the clypeus, frons, pronotum and scutellum is shiny green or brown with violet sparkles. The antennal club is dark brown. The pronotum has brown reddish tones in the lateral borders. The elytra and striae are brown yellowish, with the elytral suture and epipleura dark brown.

== Etymology ==
The species name is derived from villus (meaning hair) and refers the abundant vestiture that covers all the body.

== Taxonomy ==
This species was described by Émile Blanchard in 1851 in the genus Phyllopertha and was transferred between the genera Anomala and Strigoderma throughout its history. Casey established it as the type species of the genus Lamoana in 1915.
