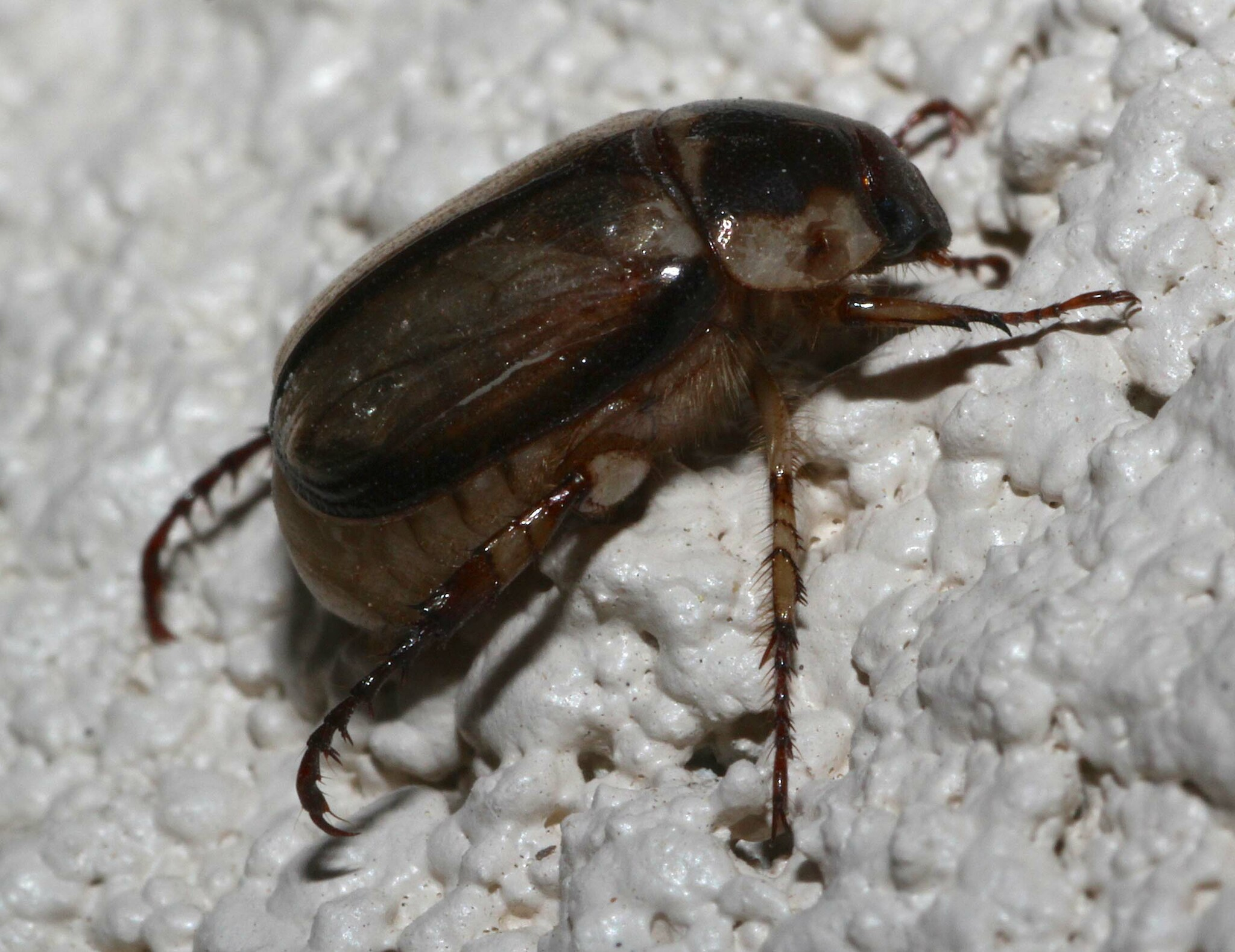
- Anomalacra arida, Arizona

Scientific classification
- Kingdom: Animalia
- Phylum: Arthropoda
- Clade: Pancrustacea
- Class: Insecta
- Order: Coleoptera
- Suborder: Polyphaga
- Infraorder: Scarabaeiformia
- Family: Scarabaeidae
- Genus: Anomalacra
- Species: A. arida

Binomial name
- Anomalacra arida (Casey, 1915)

Synonyms
- Anomala arida Casey, 1915

= Anomalacra arida =

Species of beetles

Anomalacra arida is a species of shining leaf chafer in the scarab beetle family Scarabaeidae. It is found in the southwestern United States and northern Mexico.
