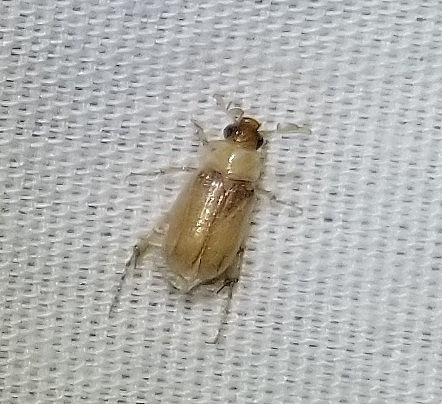
- Leptohoplia testaceipennis

Scientific classification
- Kingdom: Animalia
- Phylum: Arthropoda
- Clade: Pancrustacea
- Class: Insecta
- Order: Coleoptera
- Suborder: Polyphaga
- Infraorder: Scarabaeiformia
- Family: Scarabaeidae
- Tribe: Anomalini
- Genus: Leptohoplia; Saylor, 1935

= Leptohoplia =

Genus of beetles

Leptohoplia is a genus of shining leaf chafers in the family of beetles known as Scarabaeidae. There are at least two described species in Leptohoplia.

== Species ==
These two species belong to the genus Leptohoplia:

- Leptohoplia carlsoni (Hardy, 1976)^{c g}
- Leptohoplia testaceipennis Saylor, 1935^{i c g b}

Data sources: i = ITIS, c = Catalogue of Life, g = GBIF, b = Bugguide.net
