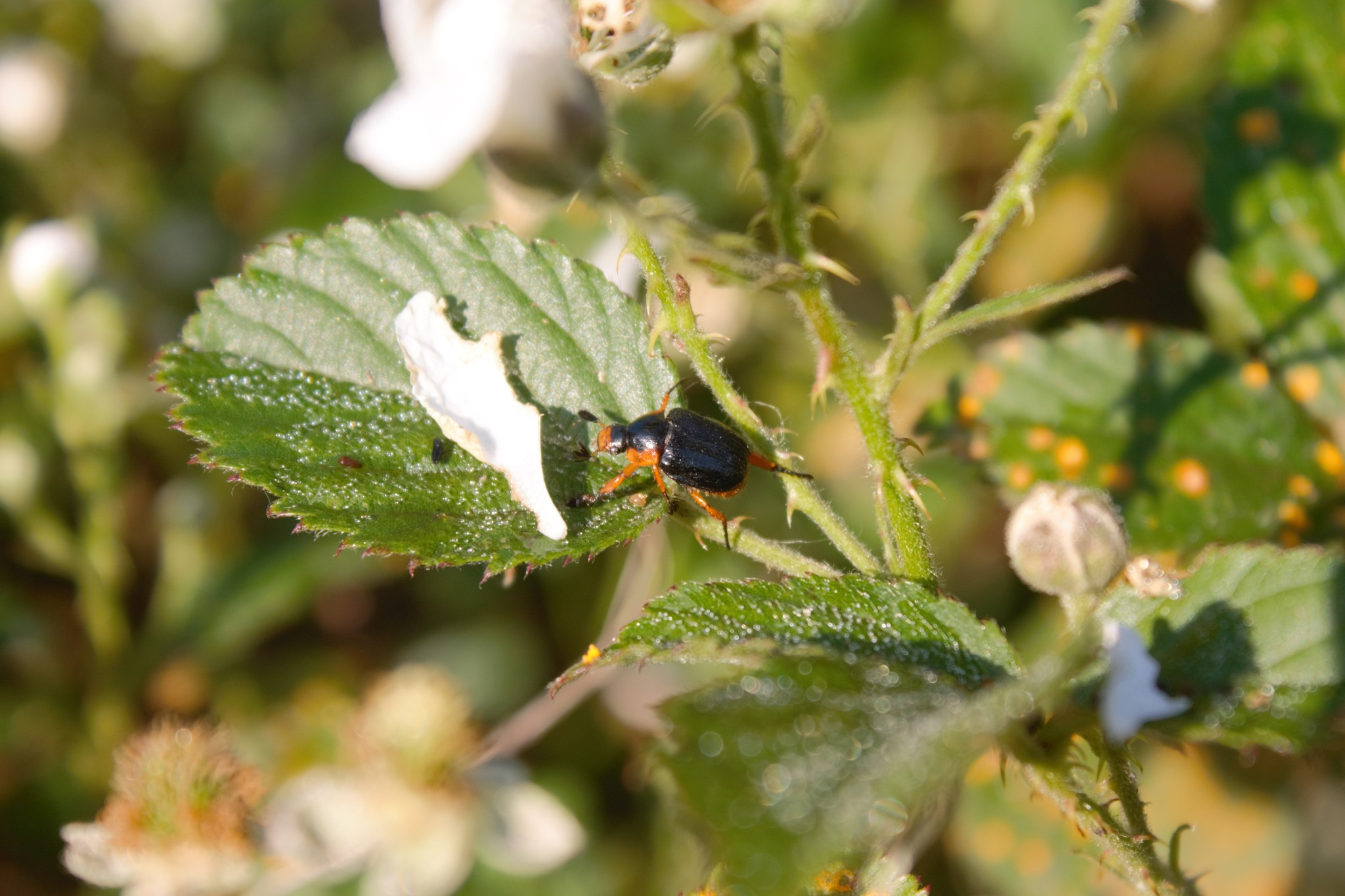
- Pachystethus nectoctenus, México

Scientific classification
- Kingdom: Animalia
- Phylum: Arthropoda
- Class: Insecta
- Order: Coleoptera
- Suborder: Polyphaga
- Infraorder: Scarabaeiformia
- Family: Scarabaeidae
- Subfamily: Rutelinae
- Tribe: Rutelini
- Genus: Pachystethus; Blanchard, 1851

= Pachystethus =

Genus of beetles

Pachystethus is a genus of shining leaf chafers in the beetle family Scarabaeidae. There are about six described species in Pachystethus, found in Mexico and Central America.

== Species ==
These six species belong to the genus Pachystethus:

- Pachystethus crassesculptus (Bates, 1889) (Guatemala, Mexico)
- Pachystethus ixtacomitanus Ramírez-Ponce & Morón, 2012 (Mexico)
- Pachystethus matzapatlecus Ramírez-Ponce & Morón, 2012 (Mexico)
- Pachystethus nectoctenus Ramírez-Ponce & Morón, 2012 (Mexico)
- Pachystethus nutans (Bates, 1888) (Guatemala, Mexico)
- Pachystethus viduus (Newman, 1838) (Mexico, Panama)
