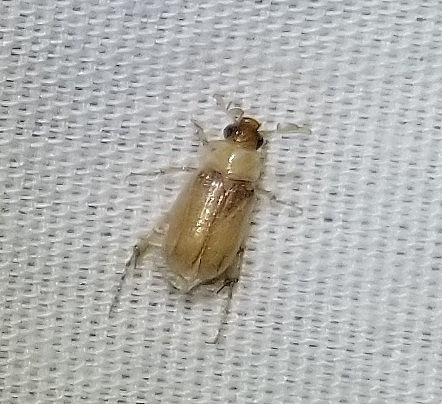

Scientific classification
- Kingdom: Animalia
- Phylum: Arthropoda
- Clade: Pancrustacea
- Class: Insecta
- Order: Coleoptera
- Suborder: Polyphaga
- Infraorder: Scarabaeiformia
- Family: Scarabaeidae
- Genus: Leptohoplia
- Species: L. testaceipennis

Binomial name
- Leptohoplia testaceipennis Saylor, 1935

= Leptohoplia testaceipennis =

Species of beetle

Leptohoplia testaceipennis is a species of shining leaf chafer in the family of beetles known as Scarabaeidae. It is found in North America.
