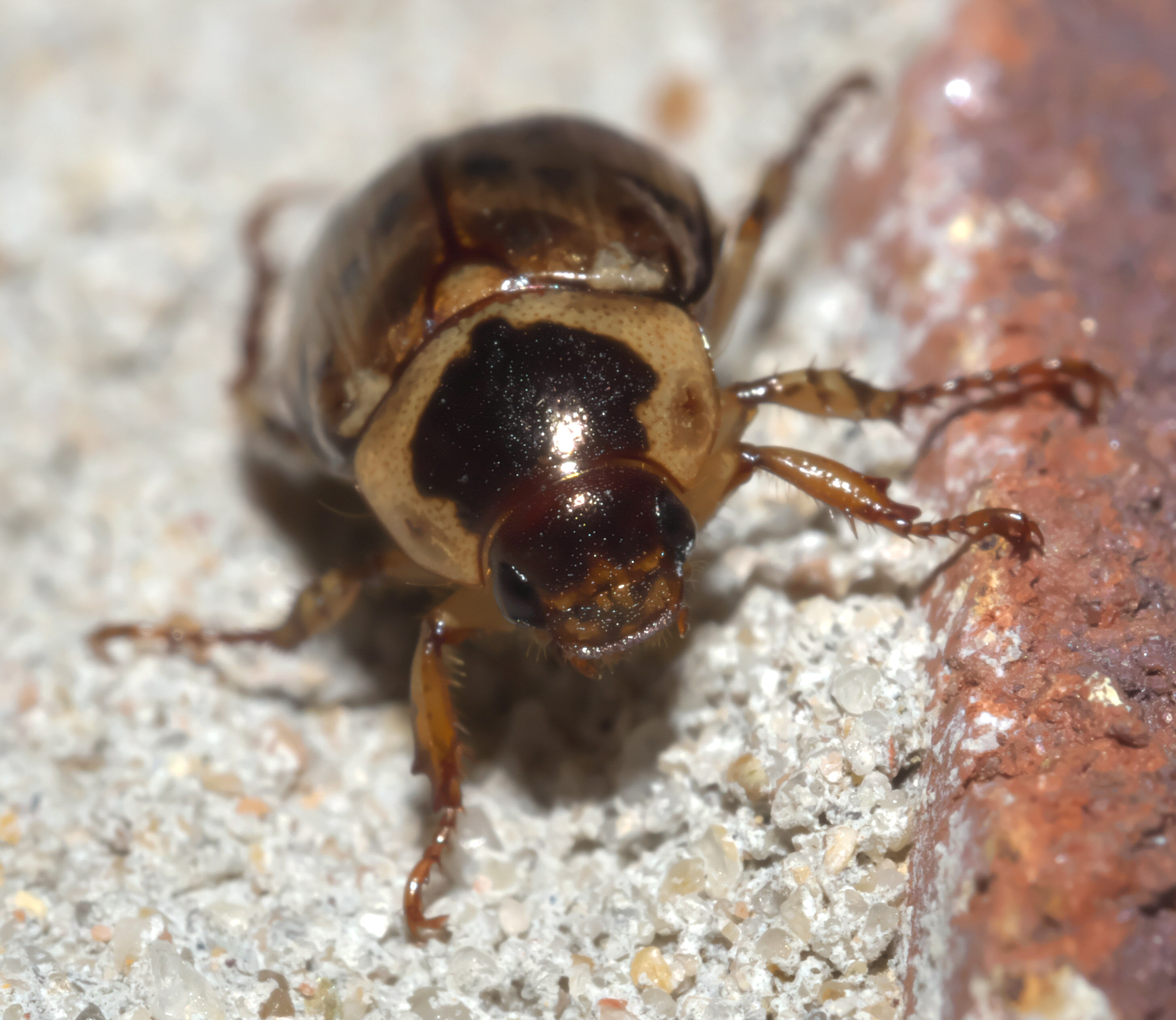
- Anomalacra innuba, Oklahoma

Scientific classification
- Kingdom: Animalia
- Phylum: Arthropoda
- Clade: Pancrustacea
- Class: Insecta
- Order: Coleoptera
- Suborder: Polyphaga
- Infraorder: Scarabaeiformia
- Family: Scarabaeidae
- Subfamily: Rutelinae
- Tribe: Anomalini
- Genus: Anomalacra; Casey, 1915

Subgenera
- Anomalacra Casey, 1915; Bucaphallanus Ramírez-Ponce & Morón, 2012; Pulchrotes Ramírez-Ponce, 2024

Synonyms
- Anomala (Paranomala) Casey, 1915; Paranomala Casey, 1915

= Anomalacra =

Genus of beetles

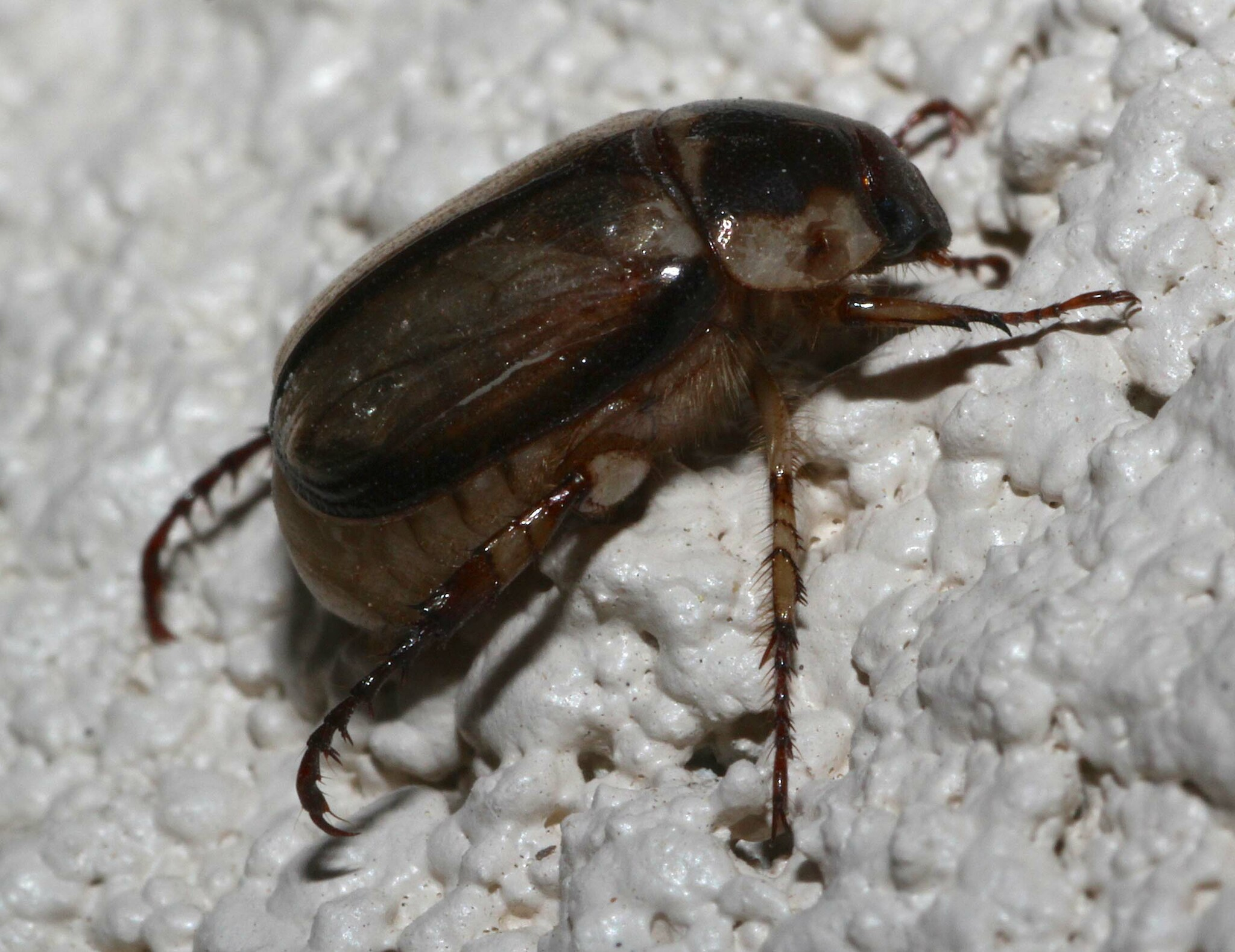
Anomalacra arida, Arizona

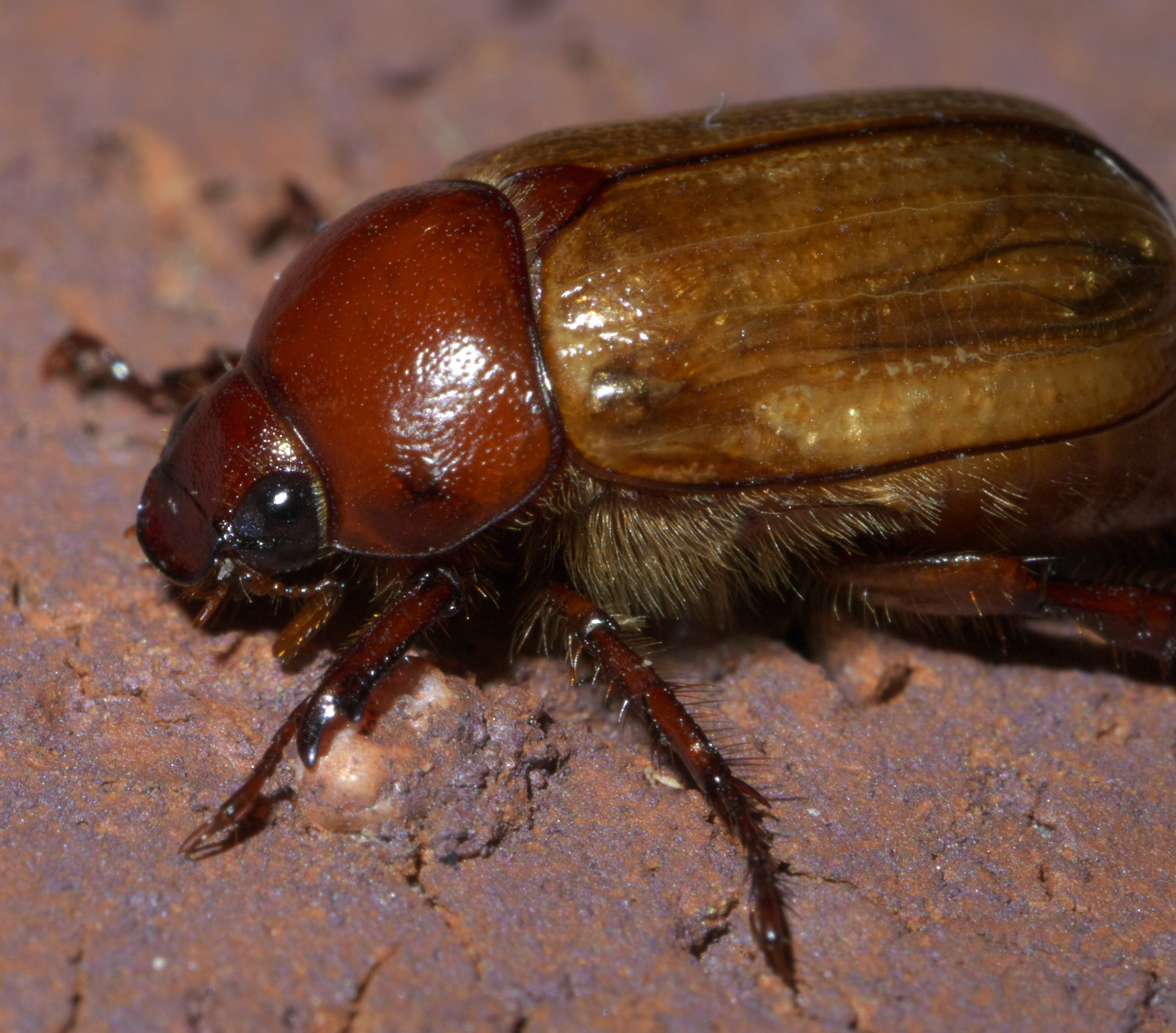
Anomalacra flavipennis, Oklahoma

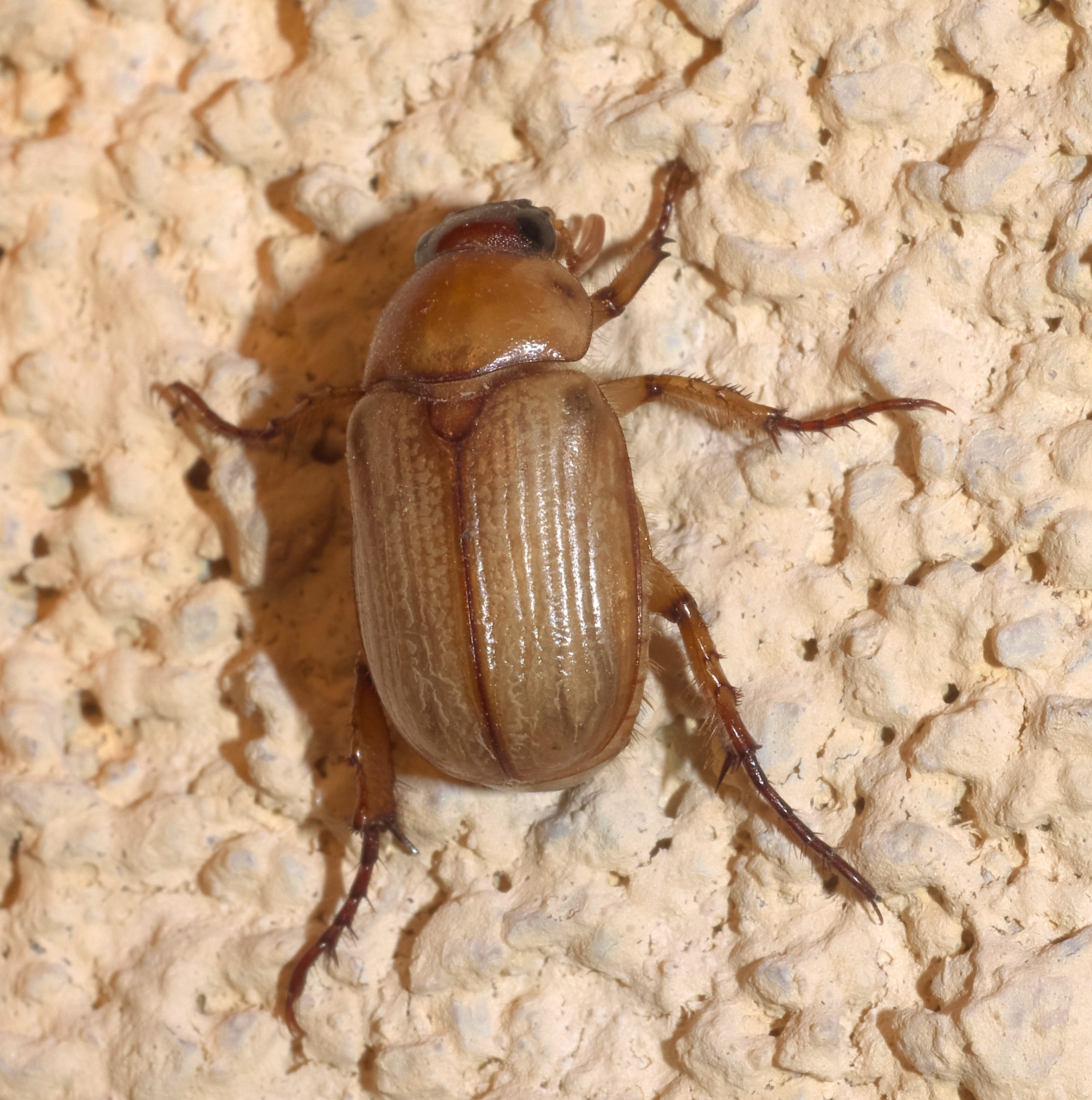
Anomalacra cavifrons, New Mexico

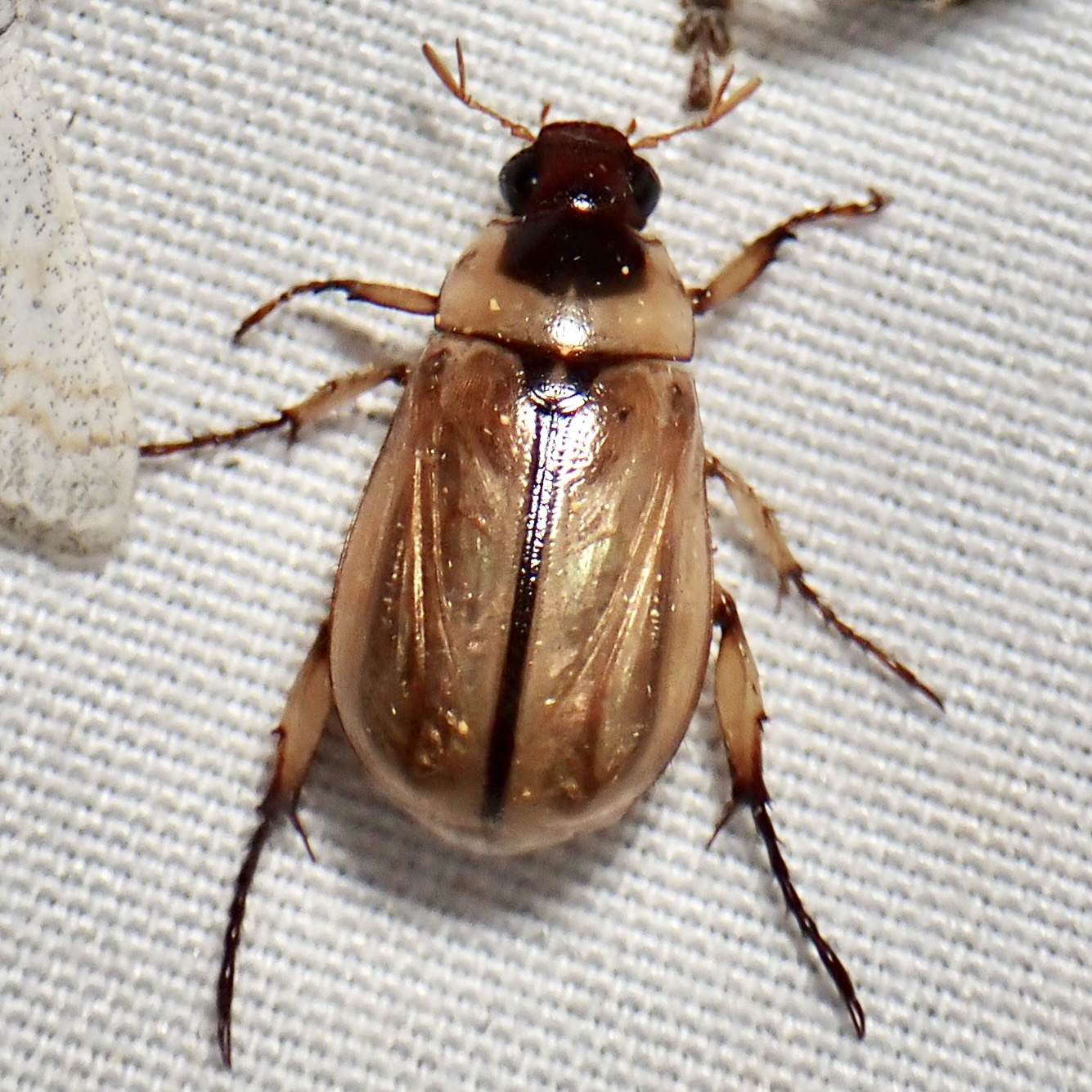
Anomalacra delicata, Arizona

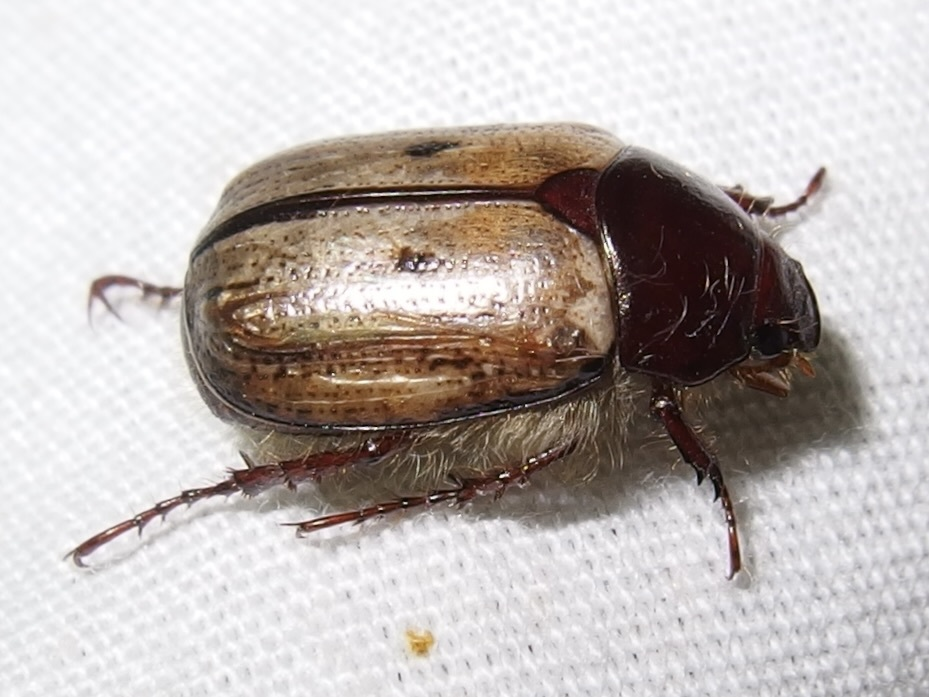
Anomalacra ellipsis , México

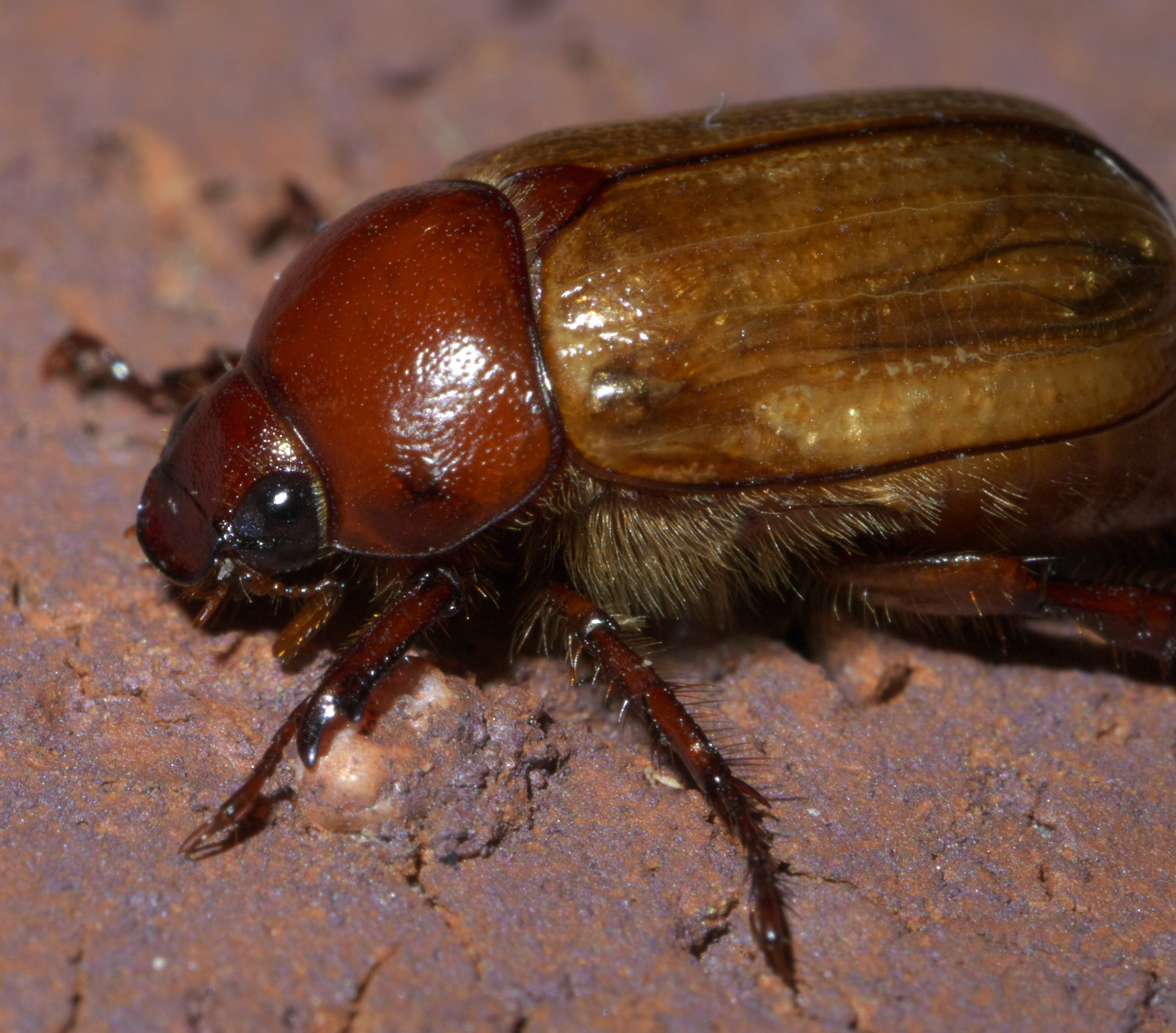
Anomalacra flavipennis , Oklahoma

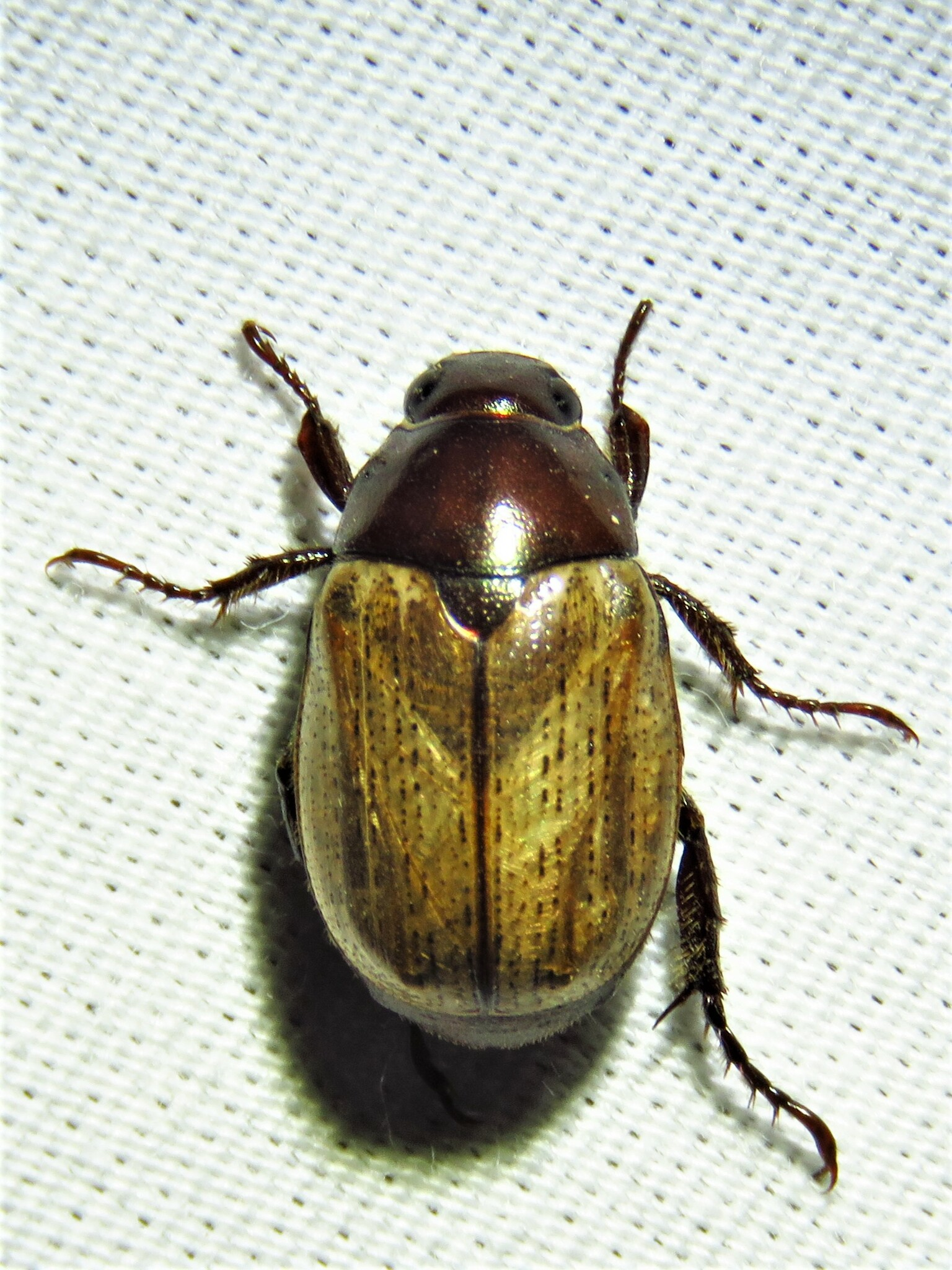
Anomalacra foraminosa, Texas

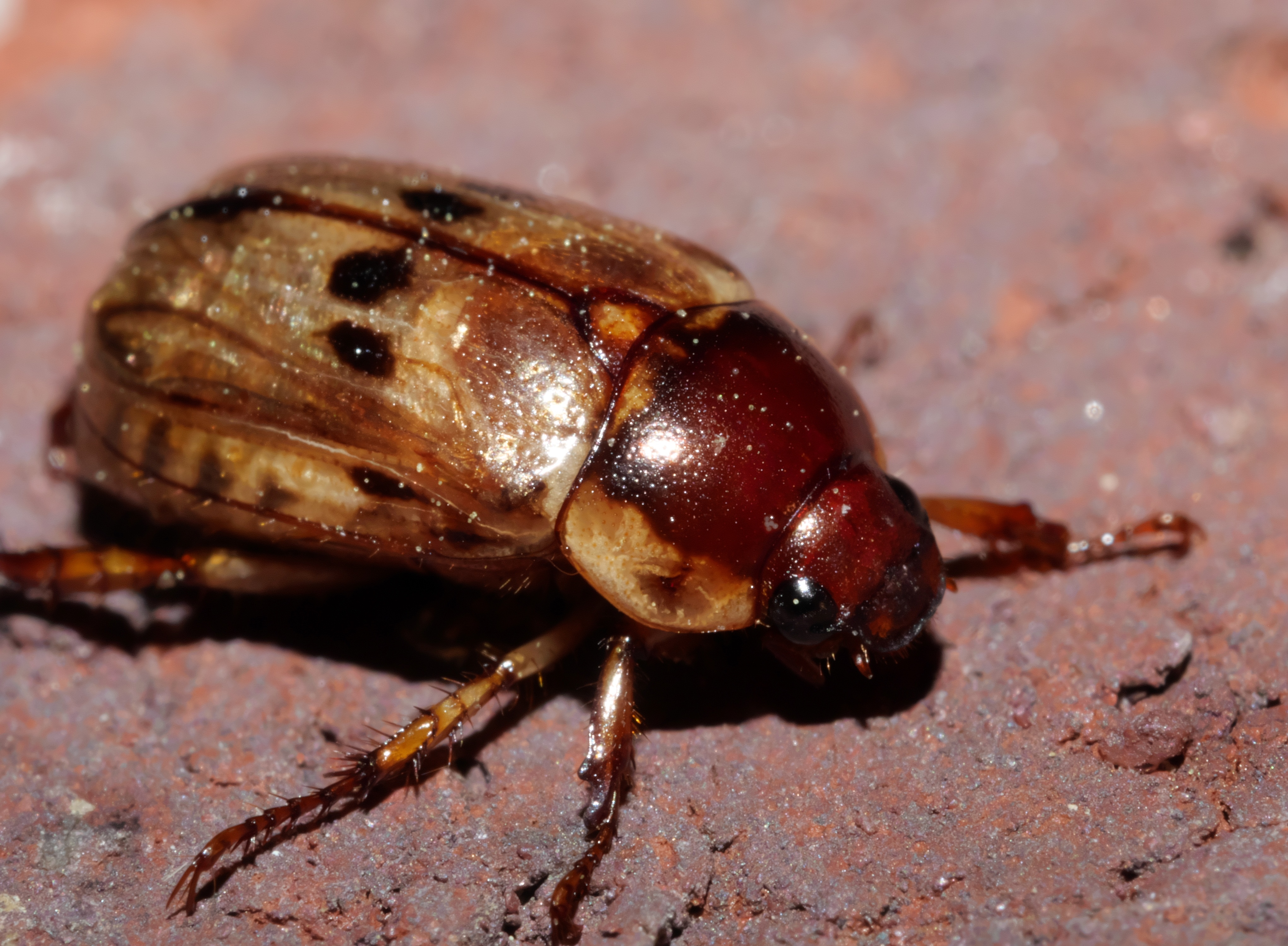
Anomalacra undulata, Oklahoma

Anomalacra is a genus of shining leaf chafers in the beetle family Scarabaeidae. There are more than 190 described species in Anomalacra.

Many of the new world species of the genus Anomala were transferred to this genus, so they may sometimes be called Anomala instead of Anomalacra.

== Species ==
These 197 species belong to the genus Anomalacra:

- Anomalacra adscita (Robinson, 1941)
- Anomalacra aereiventris (Filippini, Micó & Galante, 2015)
- Anomalacra amphicoma (Bates, 1888)
- Anomalacra antennata (Schaeffer, 1906)
- Anomalacra antica (Ohaus, 1897)
- Anomalacra arara (Ohaus, 1897)
- Anomalacra arida (Casey, 1915)
- Anomalacra aspersa (Filippini, Micó & Galante, 2015)
- Anomalacra atomogramma (Bates, 1888)
- Anomalacra atrivillosa (Filippini, Micó & Galante, 2015)
- Anomalacra attenuata (Bates, 1888)
- Anomalacra ayjikcala (Morón & Nogueira, 2002)
- Anomalacra balzapambae (Ohaus, 1897)
- Anomalacra barbicollis (Bates, 1888)
- Anomalacra batesi (Ohaus, 1902)
- Anomalacra beckeri (Ohaus, 1897)
- Anomalacra beckeriana (Ramírez-Ponce & Morón, 2012)
- Anomalacra bimaculata (Blanchard, 1851)
- Anomalacra binotata (Gyllenhal, 1817)
- Anomalacra boliviana (Ohaus, 1897)
- Anomalacra bruchiana (Ohaus, 1911)
- Anomalacra brunnipennis (Gyllenhal, 1817)
- Anomalacra calceata (Chevrolat, 1865)
- Anomalacra calligrapha (Bates, 1888)
- Anomalacra capito (Ohaus, 1897)
- Anomalacra carinifrons (Bates, 1888)
- Anomalacra castaniceps (Bates, 1888)
- Anomalacra catoxantha (Burmeister, 1855)
- Anomalacra cavifrons LeConte, 1867
- Anomalacra centralis (LeConte, 1863)
- Anomalacra championi (Bates, 1888)
- Anomalacra chapini (Robinson, 1948)
- Anomalacra chevrolati (Bates, 1888)
- Anomalacra chimalapensis (Ramírez-Ponce, et al., 2024)
- Anomalacra chiriquina (Bates, 1888)
- Anomalacra chromicolor (Burmeister, 1855)
- Anomalacra cinaedias (Filippini, Micó & Galante, 2016)
- Anomalacra cincta (Say, 1835)
- Anomalacra clarivillosa (Filippini, Micó & Galante, 2015)
- Anomalacra clathrata (Ohaus, 1930)
- Anomalacra clypealis (Schaeffer, 1907)
- Anomalacra cnethopyga (Bates, 1888)
- Anomalacra colonica (Casey, 1915)
- Anomalacra columbica (Ohaus, 1902)
- Anomalacra compressicollis (Bates, 1888)
- Anomalacra corcovada (Ramírez-Ponce, Bitar & Curoe, 2014)
- Anomalacra crassisura (Casey, 1915)
- Anomalacra cribriceps (Bates, 1888)
- Anomalacra crinicollis (Ohaus, 1902)
- Anomalacra crucialis (Casey, 1915)
- Anomalacra cupricollis (Chevrolat, 1835)
- Anomalacra decolor (Bates, 1888)
- Anomalacra delicata (Casey, 1915)
- Anomalacra denticollis (Bates, 1888)
- Anomalacra digressa (Casey, 1915)
- Anomalacra discoidalis (Bates, 1888)
- Anomalacra donovani (Stephens, 1830)
- Anomalacra doryphorina (Bates, 1888)
- Anomalacra ellipsis (Casey, 1915)
- Anomalacra eucoma (Bates, 1888)
- Anomalacra eulissa (Bates, 1888)
- Anomalacra eusticta (Filippini, Micó & Galante, 2015)
- Anomalacra flamina (Ohaus, 1933)
- Anomalacra flavilla (Bates, 1888)
- Anomalacra flavipennis Burmeister, 1844
- Anomalacra flavizona (Bates, 1888)
- Anomalacra flohri (Ohaus, 1897)
- Anomalacra flohriana (Ramírez-Ponce & Morón, 2012)
- Anomalacra foraminosa (Bates, 1888)
- Anomalacra forreri (Bates, 1888)
- Anomalacra forreriana (Ramírez-Ponce & Morón, 2012)
- Anomalacra forstroemi (Billberg, 1820)
- Anomalacra foveiceps (Ohaus, 1897)
- Anomalacra fulgidicollis (Blanchard, 1851)
- Anomalacra fulvocostata (Ohaus, 1902)
- Anomalacra gemella (Say, 1835)
- Anomalacra globulata (Filippini, Micó & Galante, 2015)
- Anomalacra guatemalena (Bates, 1888)
- Anomalacra hardyorum (Potts, 1976)
- Anomalacra hiata (Filippini, Micó & Galante, 2015)
- Anomalacra hispidipennis (Ohaus, 1897)
- Anomalacra hispidula (Bates, 1888)
- Anomalacra histrionella (Bates, 1888)
- Anomalacra hoegei (Ohaus, 1897)
- Anomalacra hoegeiana (Ramírez-Ponce & Morón, 2012)
- Anomalacra hoepfneri (Bates, 1888)
- Anomalacra hondurana (Ramírez-Ponce, et al., 2024)
- Anomalacra hoppi (Ohaus, 1928)
- Anomalacra hylobia (Ohaus, 1897)
- Anomalacra imperialae (Potts, 1976)
- Anomalacra inbio (Ramírez-Ponce, Bitar & Curoe, 2014)
- Anomalacra inconstans (Burmeister, 1844)
- Anomalacra innuba (Fabricius, 1787)
- Anomalacra insularis (Laporte, 1840)
- Anomalacra juquilensis (Ohaus, 1897)
- Anomalacra kanei (Potts, 1976)
- Anomalacra laesicollis (Bates, 1888)
- Anomalacra latifalculata (Filippini, Micó & Galante, 2015)
- Anomalacra leopardina (Filippini, Micó & Galante, 2015)
- Anomalacra levicollis (Filippini, Micó & Galante, 2015)
- Anomalacra ligulipes (Ohaus, 1897)
- Anomalacra limbaticollis (Blanchard, 1851)
- Anomalacra longipennis (Casey, 1915)
- Anomalacra longisacculata (Filippini, Micó & Galante, 2015)
- Anomalacra lucicola (Fabricius, 1798)
- Anomalacra ludoviciana (Schaeffer, 1906)
- Anomalacra marginicollis (Bates, 1888)
- Anomalacra medellina (Ohaus, 1897)
- Anomalacra megalia (Bates, 1888)
- Anomalacra megalops (Bates, 1888)
- Anomalacra mendica (Casey, 1915)
- Anomalacra mesocnemis (Ohaus, 1902)
- Anomalacra m-fuscum (Filippini, Micó & Galante, 2015)
- Anomalacra micans (Burmeister, 1844)
- Anomalacra millepora (Bates, 1888)
- Anomalacra minuta (Burmeister, 1844)
- Anomalacra mixeana (Morón & Nogueira, 2002)
- Anomalacra moroni (Filippini, Micó & Galante, 2015)
- Anomalacra mutabilis (Ohaus, 1897)
- Anomalacra nimbosa (Casey, 1915)
- Anomalacra nitescens (Bates, 1888)
- Anomalacra nogueiraiana (Ramírez-Ponce & Morón, 2012)
- Anomalacra oblivia (Horn, 1884)
- Anomalacra obovata (Ohaus, 1933)
- Anomalacra ochrogastra (Bates, 1888)
- Anomalacra ochroptera (Bates, 1888)
- Anomalacra oreas (Ohaus, 1897)
- Anomalacra parvaeucoma (Filippini, Micó & Galante, 2015)
- Anomalacra parvula (Burmeister, 1844)
- Anomalacra peninsularis (Schaeffer, 1906)
- Anomalacra pernambucana (Ohaus, 1902)
- Anomalacra perspicax (Filippini, Micó & Galante, 2015)
- Anomalacra phosphora (Bates, 1888)
- Anomalacra piccolina (Filippini, Micó & Galante, 2015)
- Anomalacra picturella (Morón & Nogueira, 2002)
- Anomalacra pilosipennis (Ohaus, 1897)
- Anomalacra pincelada (Filippini, Galante & Micó, 2015)
- Anomalacra plurisulcata (Bates, 1888)
- Anomalacra polygona (Bates, 1888)
- Anomalacra popayana (Ohaus, 1897)
- Anomalacra praecellens (Bates, 1888)
- Anomalacra punctatipennis (Blanchard, 1851)
- Anomalacra pupillata (Burmeister, 1844)
- Anomalacra quiche (Ohaus, 1897)
- Anomalacra quirina (Ohaus, 1933)
- Anomalacra repressa (Ohaus, 1908)
- Anomalacra retusicollis (Bates, 1888)
- Anomalacra rhizotrogoides (Blanchard, 1851)
- Anomalacra rhodope (Bates, 1888)
- Anomalacra robiginosa (Filippini, Galante & Micó, 2015)
- Anomalacra ruatana (Bates, 1888)
- Anomalacra salticola (Ohaus, 1897)
- Anomalacra schaefferi (Seidel, 2021)
- Anomalacra sejuncta (Bates, 1888)
- Anomalacra semicincta (Bates, 1888)
- Anomalacra semilivida (LeConte, 1878)
- Anomalacra semitonsa (Bates, 1888)
- Anomalacra simillima (Ohaus, 1897)
- Anomalacra simulans (Casey, 1915)
- Anomalacra smithiana (Ramírez-Ponce & Morón, 2012)
- Anomalacra sticticoptera (Blanchard, 1851)
- Anomalacra stillaticia (Filippini, Micó & Galante, 2015)
- Anomalacra strigicollis (Ohaus, 1902)
- Anomalacra suavis (Potts, 1976)
- Anomalacra subaenea (Nonfried, 1893)
- Anomalacra subridens (Filippini, Micó & Galante, 2015)
- Anomalacra subusta (Filippini, Micó & Galante, 2015)
- Anomalacra sylphis (Bates, 1888)
- Anomalacra techacapana (Morón & Nogueira, 2002)
- Anomalacra tenera (Casey, 1915)
- Anomalacra tenoriensis (Filippini, Micó & Galante, 2015)
- Anomalacra terroni (Morón & Nogueira, 1998)
- Anomalacra terronoides (Morón & Nogueira, 2002)
- Anomalacra tessellatipennis (Blanchard, 1851)
- Anomalacra testaceipennis (Blanchard, 1851)
- Anomalacra tindakua (Morón & Nogueira, 2002)
- Anomalacra tolensis (Bates, 1888)
- Anomalacra tolucana (Ohaus, 1902)
- Anomalacra trapezifera (Bates, 1888)
- Anomalacra tricostulata (Ohaus, 1897)
- Anomalacra tuberculata (Filippini, Micó & Galante, 2015)
- Anomalacra umbra (Casey, 1915)
- Anomalacra undulata Melsheimer, 1845
- Anomalacra valida (Burmeister, 1844)
- Anomalacra vallisneria (Filippini, Micó & Galante, 2015)
- Anomalacra vanpatteni (Bates, 1888)
- Anomalacra variolata (Bates, 1888)
- Anomalacra variolosa (Ohaus, 1928)
- Anomalacra vayana (Ohaus, 1930)
- Anomalacra veraecrucis (Bates, 1888)
- Anomalacra vespertilio (Ohaus, 1902)
- Anomalacra vicenti (Franz, 1955)
- Anomalacra violacea (Burmeister, 1844)
- Anomalacra vulcanicola (Ohaus, 1897)
- Anomalacra werneri (Howden, 1955)
- Anomalacra zapotensis (Bates, 1888)
- Anomalacra zaragozai (Ramírez-Ponce, 2011)
