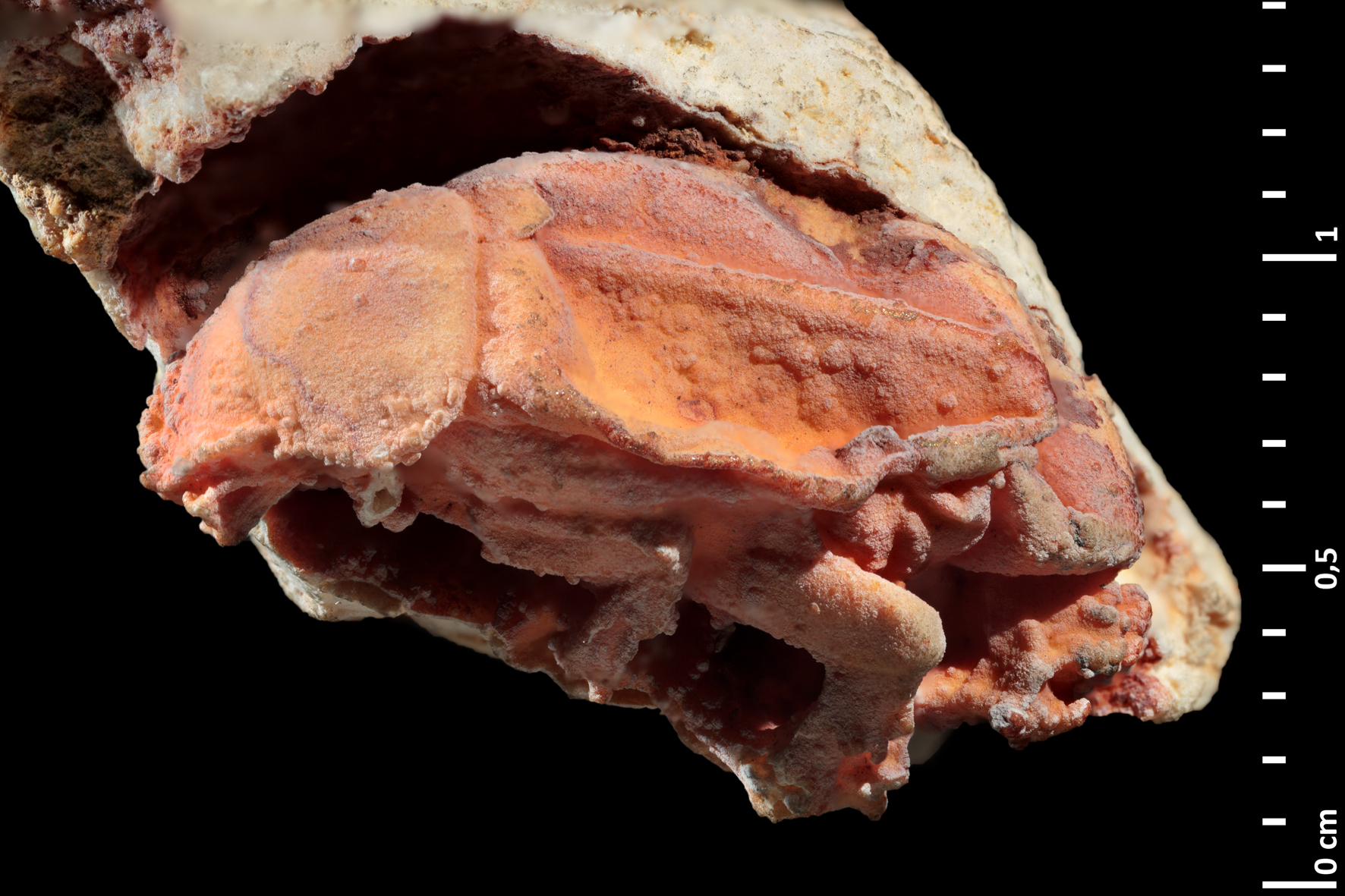
- Anomalites fugitivus preserved in quartz.

Scientific classification
- Domain: Eukaryota
- Kingdom: Animalia
- Phylum: Arthropoda
- Class: Insecta
- Order: Coleoptera
- Suborder: Polyphaga
- Infraorder: Scarabaeiformia
- Family: Scarabaeidae
- Genus: †Anomalites
- Species: †A. fugitivus

Binomial name
- †Anomalites fugitivus Frič, 1885

= Anomalites =

Extinct genus of scarab beetle

Anomalites is an extinct genus of shining leaf chafer scarab beetle which contains the solitary species Anomalites fugitivus. The species was found preserved in Eocene age quartz from Central France and was first described by Antonín Frič.

== Distribution ==
The only known specimen was recovered from "freshwater quartz" (German: Süßwasserquarz) quarried in Nogent-le-Rotrou of Centre-Val de Loire, France before 1885. The quartz deposits were initially dated only as generally Tertiary, but later refinement of the age estimates have given an age in the Priabonian of the Eocene.

== History and classification ==
The only known Anomalites fugitivus fossil was discovered by V. Spigl, a worker in the Prague millstone factory owned by Gabrial Zizka. During the carving process, Spigl encountered a small pocket in the freshwater quartz with the quartz cast replacement of the beetle preserved inside. The beetle and cavity were saved and shown to Zizka, who in turn entrusted same to Czech paleontologist Antonín Frič for examination. Frič presented the specimen in a talk on March 7, 1884, and then in a paper printed by the Royal Bohemian Society of Sciences in 1885. Based on the limited characteristics present and visible though the outer quartz shell, he determined that the beetle was similar to the modern genus Anomala, and gave it the new genus name Anomalites in reflection of that. He coined the species epithet fugitivus as a reference to the fossil's discovery so far from its origin spot.

Frič sent illustrations of the specimen to prominent French paleontologist Jean Albert Gaudry asking if any other fossils like it were known from the freshwater quartzes. Gaudry in turn queried a number of other French geology workers. All questioned were in agreement that the specimen was unique, with no other examples known. As such, and in compliance with paleontologist Joachim Barrande's philosophy that fossils should belong to their country of origin, Frič arranged the return of the A. fugitivus beetle to France. It was given to the Jardin des plantes, home of the National Museum of Natural History, France, where it was accessioned as specimen "MNHN.F.B68850".

== Description ==
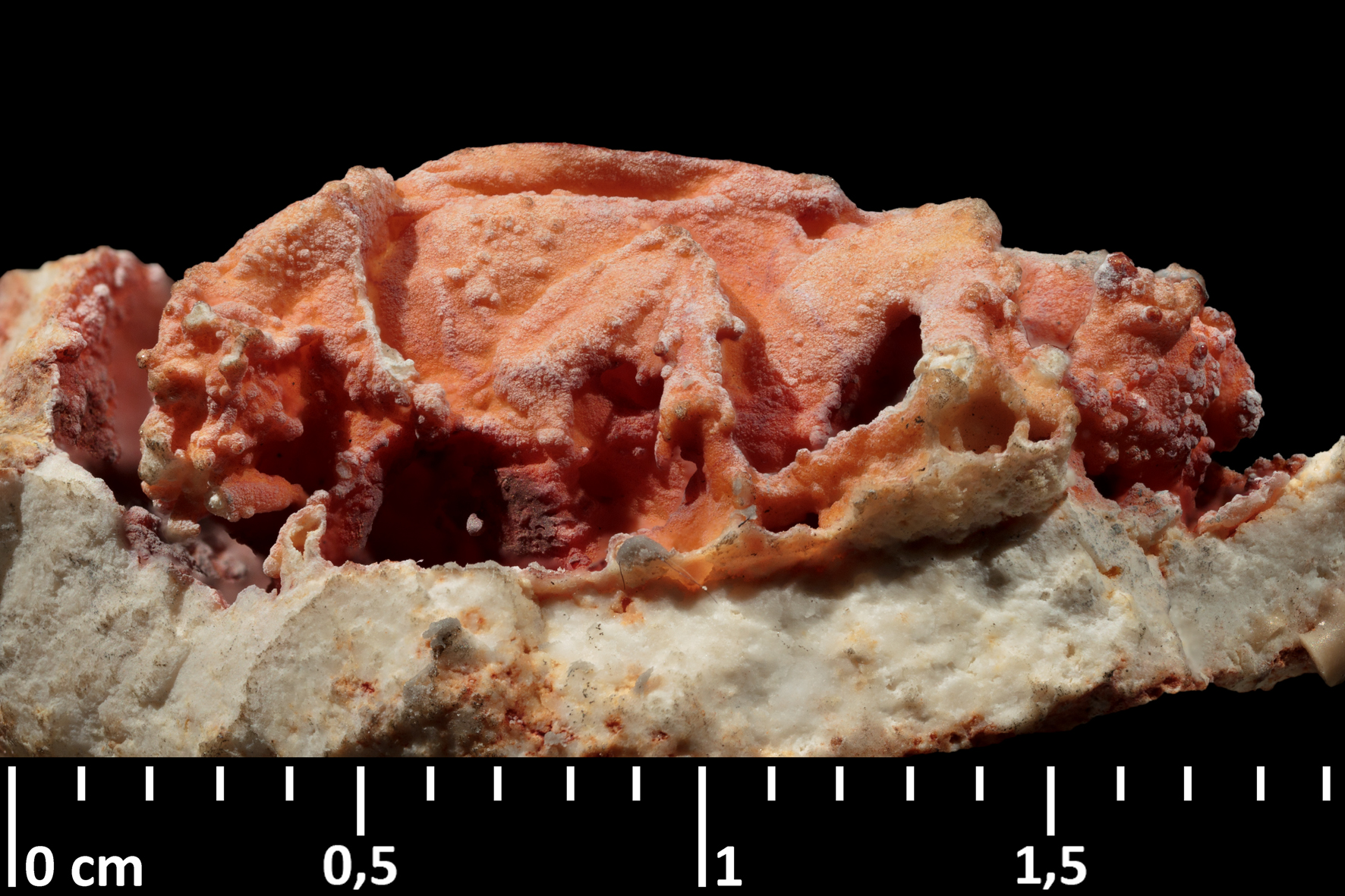
ventral view

The Anomalites fugitivus specimen is incomplete, with the lower legs missing, and the body preserved as a quartz cast attached to the matrix by a thin ridge of matrix. Frič was of the opinion that the shrunken wing casings indicated an individual still finishing pupating, the small cavity containing the beetle being a cast of the cocoon itself. He noted that the shapes of both the scutellum and head shield are very similar to the cockchafers of genus Anomala.
