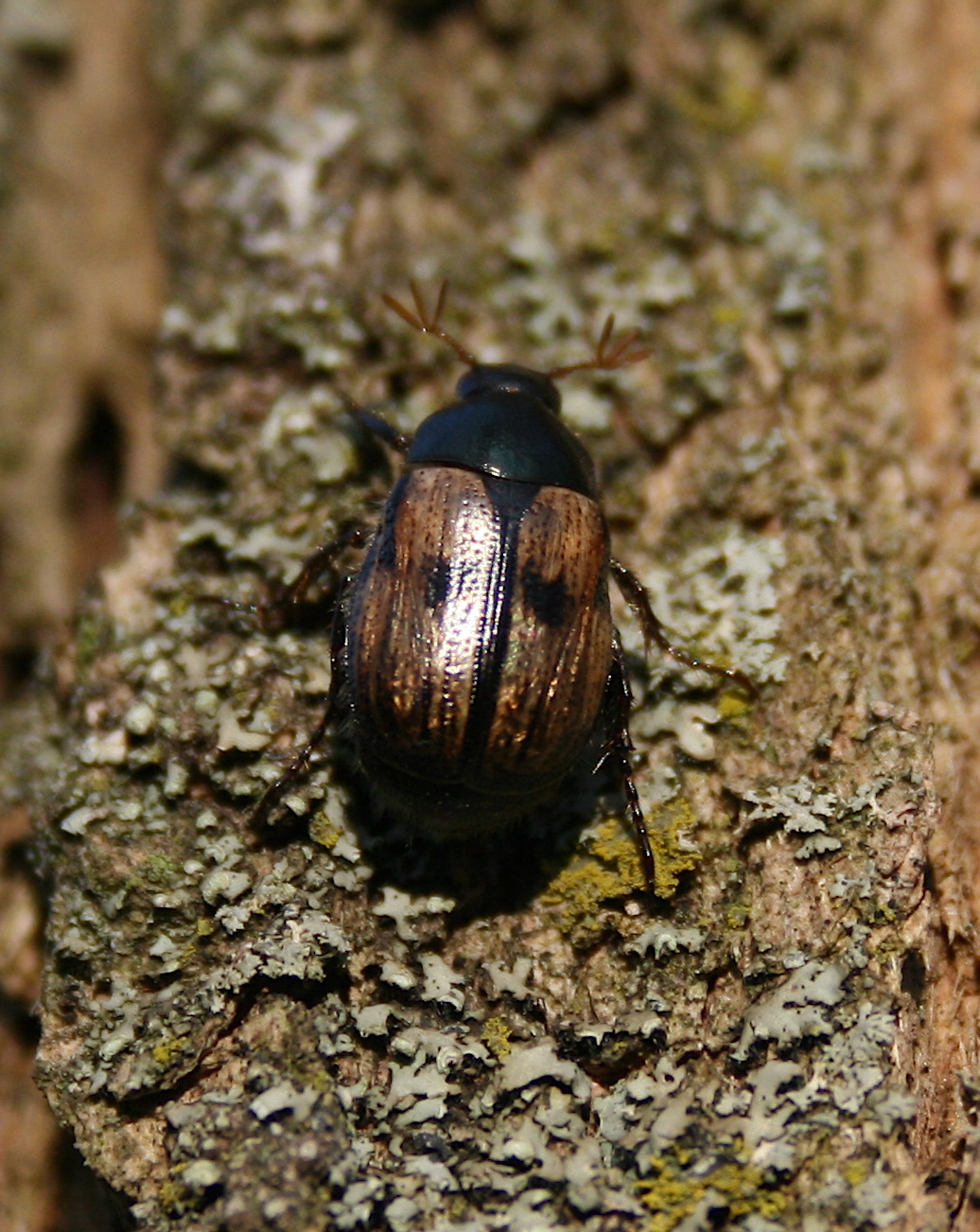

Scientific classification
- Kingdom: Animalia
- Phylum: Arthropoda
- Clade: Pancrustacea
- Class: Insecta
- Order: Coleoptera
- Suborder: Polyphaga
- Infraorder: Scarabaeiformia
- Family: Scarabaeidae
- Genus: Anomalacra
- Species: A. binotata

Binomial name
- Anomalacra binotata (Gyllenhaal, 1817)

Synonyms
- Anomala binotata (Gyllenhal, 1817); Anomala (Paranomala) compacta Casey, 1915; Anomala marginella LeConte, 1854; Euchlora maculata Laporte, 1840; Melolontha binotata Gyllenhal, 1817; Melolontha unifasciata Say, 1825

= Anomalacra binotata =

Species of beetle

Anomalacra binotata is a species of shining leaf chafer in the family of scarab beetles, Scarabaeidae. The common name "shining leaf chafer" is sometimes applied to this species in particular, but is more often used to describe all members of the subfamily Rutelinae.

Anomalacra binotata is found in North America, primarily east of the Rocky Mountains. It is considered a pest, with adults damaging grapes and other fruit crops. The grubs are minor pests of grain such as corn, wheat, and oats.
