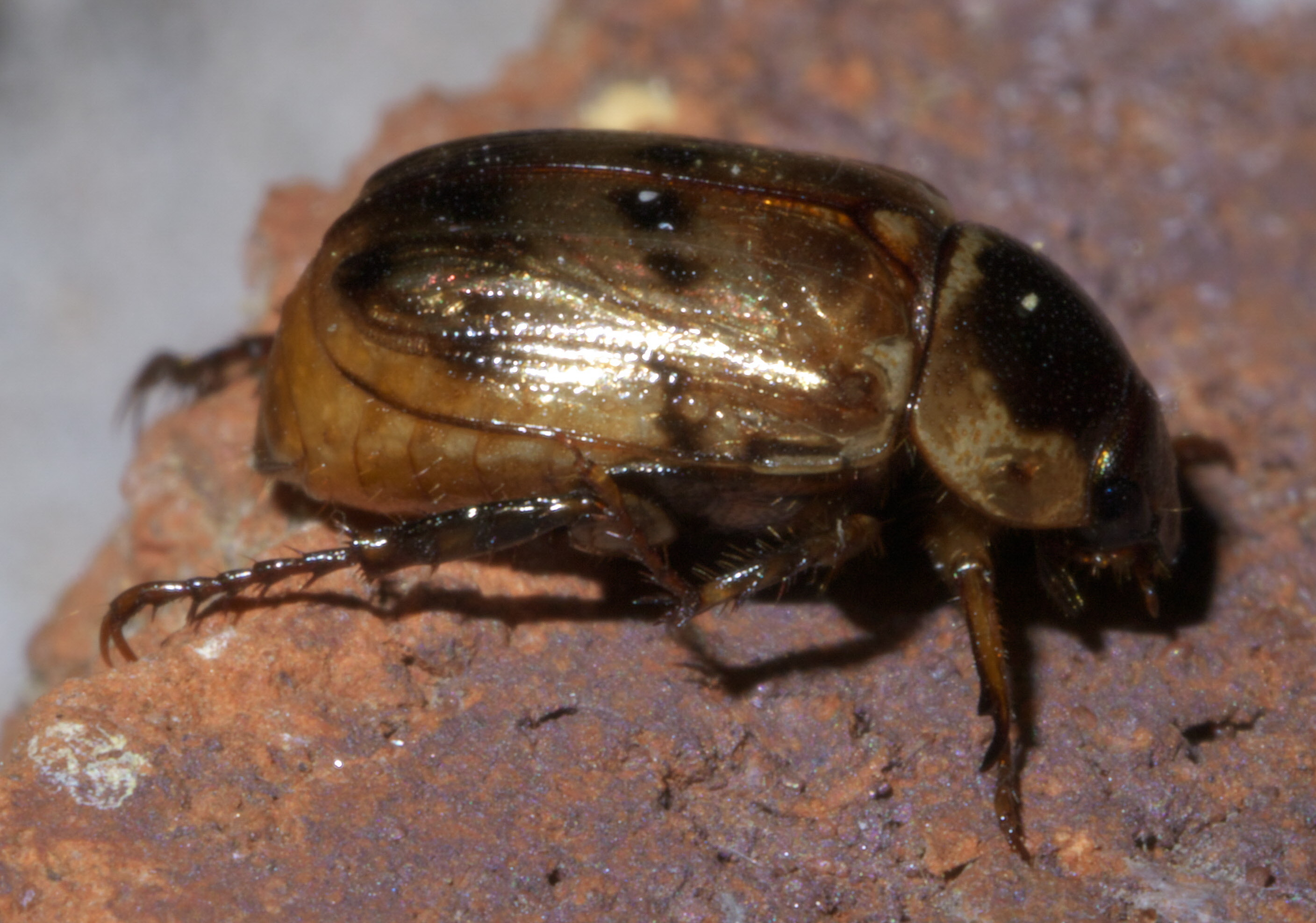
- Anomalacra innuba, Oklahoma

Scientific classification
- Kingdom: Animalia
- Phylum: Arthropoda
- Clade: Pancrustacea
- Class: Insecta
- Order: Coleoptera
- Suborder: Polyphaga
- Infraorder: Scarabaeiformia
- Family: Scarabaeidae
- Subfamily: Rutelinae
- Tribe: Anomalini; Streubel, 1839

Subtribes
- Anisopliina Burmeister, 1844; Anomalina; Dilophochilina Morón & Howden, 2001; Isopliina Péringuey, 1902; Leptohopliina Potts, 1974; Popilliina Ohaus, 1902

= Anomalini =

Tribe of beetles

Anomalini is a tribe of shining leaf chafers in the scarab beetle family Scarabaeidae. There are more than 70 genera and 2,500 described species in Anomalini.

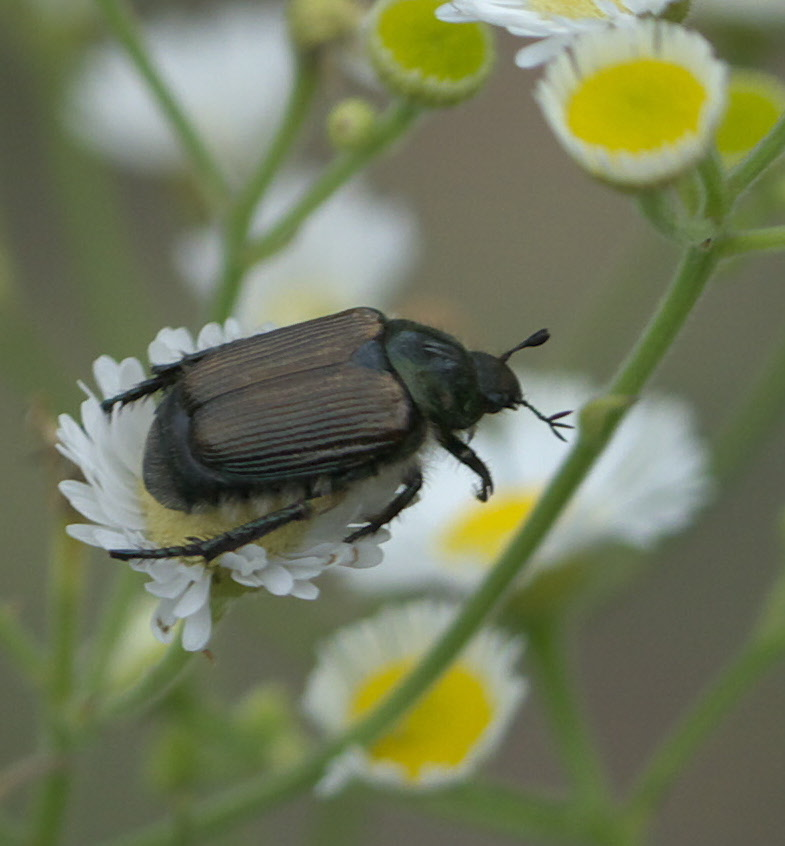
Strigoderma pimalis, Oklahoma

== Genera ==
These 72 genera belong to the tribe Anomalini:

- Adoretosoma Blanchard, 1851
- Anisoplia Dejean, 1821
- Anodontopopillia Ohaus, 1901
- Anomala Samouelle, 1819
- Anomalacra Casey, 1915
- Anomalorhina Jameson, Paucar-Cabrera & Solis, 2003
- Anoplanomala Arrow, 1917
- Anthoplia Medvedev, 1949
- Araboplia Uliana & Sabatinelli, 2017
- Asiopertha (Machatschke, 1957)
- Balanogonia Paucar-cabrera, 2003
- Blitopertha Reitter, 1903
- Brancoplia Baraud, 1986
- Callirhinus Blanchard, 1851
- Callistethus Blanchard, 1851
- Callistopopillia Ohaus, 1903
- Chaetopteroplia Medvedev, 1949
- Chelilabia Morón & Nogueira, 1998
- Cyriopertha Reitter, 1903
- Dactylopopillia Arrow, 1917
- Dalatamala Prokofiev, 2013
- Dicranoplia Reitter, 1903
- Dilophochila Bates, 1888
- Epectinaspis Blanchard, 1851
- Exomala Reitter, 1903
- Ganganomala Ratcliffe, Jameson & Zorn, 2018
- Glenopopillia Lin, 1980
- Gnatholabis Erichson, 1847
- Hemichaetoplia Baraud, 1986
- Hontoriella Escalera, 1914
- Hoplopus Laporte, 1832
- Ischnopopillia Kraatz, 1892
- Isoplia Burmeister, 1855
- Lamoana Casey, 1915
- Leptohoplia Saylor, 1935
- Macropopillia Ohaus, 1905
- Malaia Heller, 1891
- Mazahuapertha Morón & Nogueira, 1998
- Megapertha (Reitter, 1903)
- Melanopopillia Lin, 1980
- Micranomala Arrow, 1911
- Microlontha Petrovitz, 1967
- Micropertha Baraud, 1991
- Mimela Kirby, 1823
- Moroniella Ramírez-Ponce, 2015
- Nannopopillia Kolbe, 1894
- Nayarita Morón & Nogueira, 1998
- Nothophanus Heller, 1896
- Pachystethus Blanchard, 1851
- Paranomala Casey, 1915
- Pentanomala Ohaus, 1919
- Pharaonus Blanchard, 1851
- Phyllopertha Stephens, 1830
- Popillia Dejean, 1821
- Proagopertha Reitter, 1903
- Pseudoblitopertha Keith, 2000
- Pseudotrigonocnemis Keith, 2007
- Rhinyptia Burmeister, 1844
- Rugopertha Machatschke, 1957
- Singhala Blanchard, 1851
- Spilopopillia Kraatz, 1892
- Spinanomala Ohaus, 1910
- Stomanomala Kolbe, 1897
- Strigoderma Burmeister, 1844
- Tonkinilla Prokofiev, 2021
- Tribopertha Reitter, 1903
- Trichanomala Arrow, 1917
- Trichopopillia Ohaus, 1897
- Trigonocnemis Kraatz, 1894
- Tropiorhynchus Blanchard, 1851
- Yaaxkumukia Morón & Nogueira, 1998
- † Anomalites Fric, 1885
