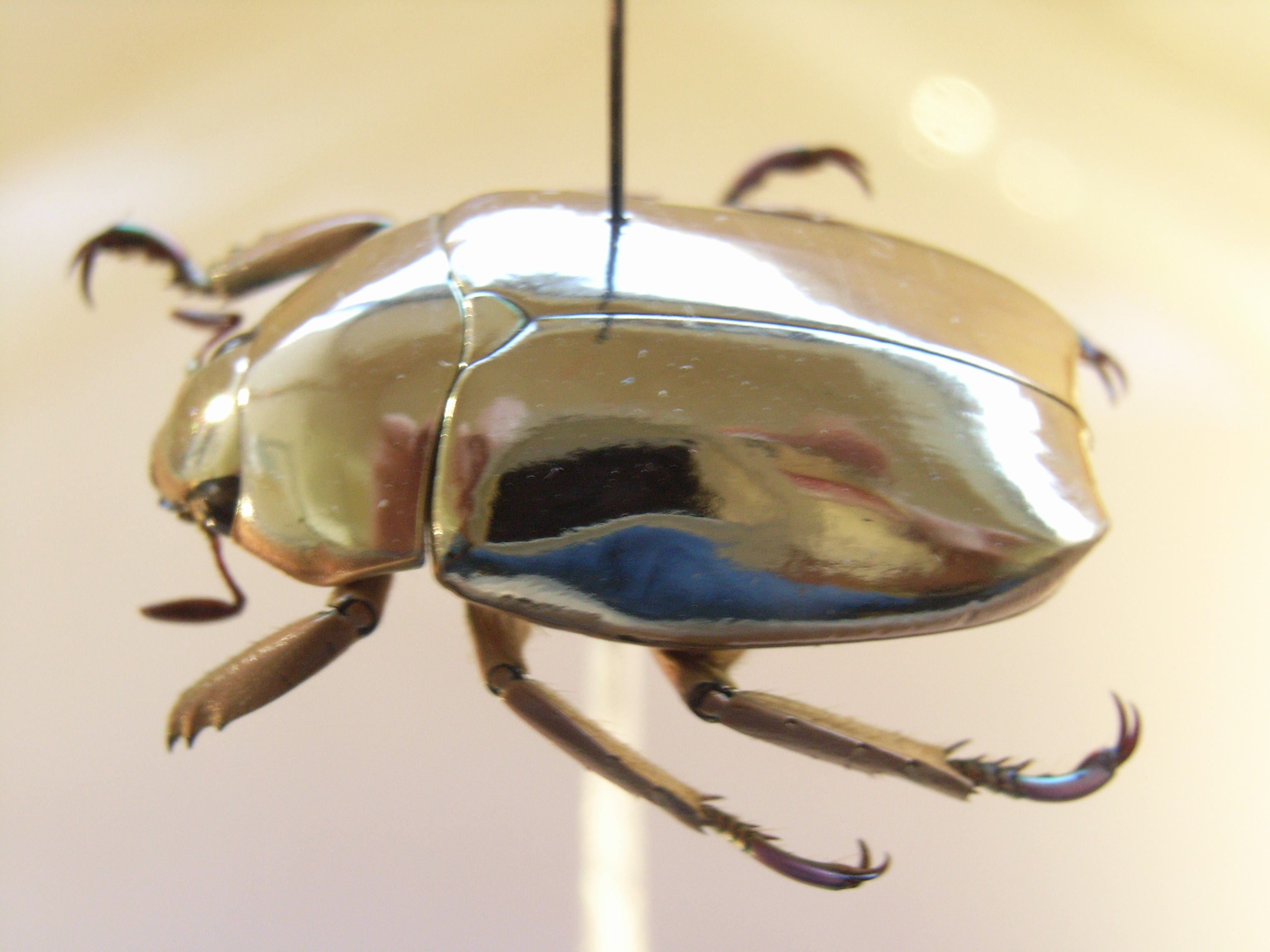
- Chrysina sp. Ex coll. Felix Stumpe

Scientific classification
- Kingdom: Animalia
- Phylum: Arthropoda
- Clade: Pancrustacea
- Class: Insecta
- Order: Coleoptera
- Suborder: Polyphaga
- Infraorder: Scarabaeiformia
- Family: Scarabaeidae
- Subfamily: Rutelinae; MacLeay, 1819

Tribes
- Adoretini; Alvarengiini; Anatistini (= Spodochlamyini); Anomalini; Anoplognathini; Geniatini; Rutelini

= Rutelinae =

Subfamily of beetles

Rutelinae or shining leaf chafers is a subfamily of the scarab beetles (family Scarabaeidae). It is a very diverse group; distributed over most of the world, it contains some 200 genera with over 4,000 described species in 7 tribes. Several taxa have yet to be described. A few recent classifications include the tribe Hopliini, but this is not generally accepted.

== Description ==
Unlike some of their relatives, their habitus is usually lacking in ornamentation, such as horns. They resemble the Melolonthinae in being fairly plesiomorphic in outward appearance. Many species have brilliant or iridescent hues, however, such as the genus Chrysina, and a number of species are serious pests (e.g., the Japanese beetle).

== Behavior ==
=== Feeding ===
Adult Rutelinae feed on leaves, flowers, and flower parts. Larvae feed on decaying wood, compost or roots.

== Tribes ==
- Adoretini
- Alvarengiini
- Anatistini (= Spodochlamyini)
- Anomalini
- Anoplognathini
- Geniatini
- Rutelini

Additionally the fossil genus Anomalites from the Priabonian Süßwasserquarz of Nogent-le-Rotrou France has been placed as incertae sedis in the subfamily.
