= List of Anomala species =

Shining leaf chafers

These 1201 species belong to Anomala, a genus of shining leaf chafers in the family Scarabaeidae.

== Anomala species ==
- Anomala abraensis Frey, 1976
- Anomala accincta Prokofiev, 2013
- Anomala achrogastra Machatschke, 1969
- Anomala acromialis (Ohaus, 1916)
- Anomala acusigera Lin, 2002
- Anomala acutangula Ohaus, 1914
- Anomala adhaerescens Ohaus, 1916
- Anomala adunca Zorn, 2011
- Anomala adustula Gerstaecker, 1884
- Anomala aegrota Arrow, 1917
- Anomala aelia Ohaus, 1932
- Anomala aeneiventris Fairmaire, 1883
- Anomala aeneoprasina Prokofiev, 2013
- Anomala aeneotincta Fairmaire, 1883
- Anomala aequalis Zorn, 2007
- Anomala aericollis Burmeister, 1855
- Anomala aeruginosa Boisduval, 1835
- Anomala affinis Ganglbauer, 1882
- Anomala afghana (Balthasar, 1968)
- Anomala agilis Arrow, 1917
- Anomala aglaos Filippini, Galante & Micó, 2015
- Anomala ahlwarthi Ohaus, 1916
- Anomala ahrensi Zorn, 2011
- Anomala akikoae (Kobayashi & Fujioka, 2013)
- Anomala albaya Arrow, 1915
- Anomala albopilosa (Hope, 1839) (Green Chafer)
- Anomala alinae Zorn, 2011
- Anomala amarginata Zhang & Lin, 2008
- Anomala amoena Frey, 1971
- Anomala amychodes Ohaus, 1914
- Anomala anacantha Ohaus, 1915
- Anomala anchoralis Lansberge, 1879
- Anomala ancilla Gerstaecker, 1867
- Anomala andamanica Arrow, 1917
- Anomala andradei Heller, 1893
- Anomala angolana Ohaus, 1925
- Anomala anguliceps Arrow, 1917
- Anomala angulicollis Arrow, 1917
- Anomala angulipennis Ohaus, 1910
- Anomala angusta Arrow, 1912
- Anomala annamensis Prokofiev, 2014
- Anomala anodonta Ohaus, 1916
- Anomala anoguttata Burmeister, 1844
- Anomala anoxantha Ohaus, 1937
- Anomala anthracina Arrow, 1912
- Anomala anthusa Ohaus, 1937
- Anomala antiqua (Gyllenhal, 1817)
- Anomala antis Ohaus, 1902
- Anomala aphodioides (Benderitter, 1927)
- Anomala apogonioides Ohaus, 1924
- Anomala ardoini Frey, 1971
- Anomala arkhipovi Limbourg, Dekoninck & Seidel, 2024
- Anomala arrawaka Ohaus, 1902
- Anomala artemida Prokofiev, 2015
- Anomala arthuri Filippini, Galante & Micó, 2014
- Anomala aruensis Zorn, 2007
- Anomala asaitoae Zorn, Kobayashi & Wada, 2017
- Anomala aspera Ohaus, 1914
- Anomala assimilis Boisduval, 1835
- Anomala atjehana (Ohaus, 1926)
- Anomala atriventris Zorn, 2011
- Anomala atrocyanea Burmeister, 1844
- Anomala atrovirens Lin, 2000
- Anomala aulacoides Ohaus, 1915
- Anomala aulax (Wiedemann, 1823)
- Anomala aureoflava Arrow, 1917
- Anomala aureola (Hope, 1839)
- Anomala auriculata Ohaus, 1916
- Anomala auripennis Arrow, 1912
- Anomala aurora Arrow, 1912
- Anomala ausonia Erichson, 1848
- Anomala australis Lin, 2002
- Anomala babai Kobayashi, 1987
- Anomala badia Ohaus, 1925
- Anomala baeri Ohaus, 1910
- Anomala bakeri Ohaus, 1914
- Anomala balduina Ohaus, 1925
- Anomala bandicola Ohaus, 1916
- Anomala barbarae Frey, 1968
- Anomala barbellata Lin, 1996
- Anomala barbellicauda Lin, 1999
- Anomala basalis (Guérin-Méneville, 1847)
- Anomala bedeli Ohaus, 1914
- Anomala behnei Zorn, 2011
- Anomala belingana Machatschke, 1971
- Anomala bella Arrow, 1917
- Anomala bengalensis (Blanchard, 1851)
- Anomala bernhardti Zorn, 1998
- Anomala biakensis Zorn, 2007
- Anomala bicolor (Fabricius, 1775)
- Anomala bidolii Ohaus, 1938
- Anomala bidoupensis Prokofiev, 2015
- Anomala bifida Zorn, 2007
- Anomala biformis Arrow, 1910
- Anomala biharensis Arrow, 1917
- Anomala bilobata Arrow, 1912
- Anomala bilunata Fairmaire, 1888
- Anomala bimarginata Ohaus, 1915
- Anomala binata Ohaus, 1926
- Anomala bipunctata Blanchard, 1851
- Anomala birmana (Heller, 1891)
- Anomala bivirgulata Fairmaire, 1893
- Anomala blaisei Ohaus, 1914
- Anomala blanchardi Arrow, 1917
- Anomala bogotensis Ohaus, 1897
- Anomala bohemani Fåhraeus, 1857
- Anomala bomiensis Zhao, Fujioka & Zorn, 2025
- Anomala bonguana Ohaus, 1916
- Anomala boromensis Brancsik, 1910
- Anomala bottae (Blanchard, 1851)
- Anomala bousqueti Le Guillou, 1844
- Anomala bouyeri Limbourg, 2016
- Anomala brachycaula Ohaus, 1915
- Anomala brachypus Bates, 1891
- Anomala brancuccii Sabatinelli, 1991
- Anomala breviceps Sharp, 1881
- Anomala brevidens Ohaus, 1914
- Anomala brevihirta Lin, 1996
- Anomala brevior Fairmaire, 1893
- Anomala breviuscula Candèze, 1869
- Anomala bruchomorpha Arrow, 1912
- Anomala bruggei Zorn, 2007
- Anomala brunnea Klug, 1855
- Anomala bryani Ohaus, 1915
- Anomala bulbicaula Prokofiev, 2013
- Anomala burgeoni Benderitter, 1928
- Anomala butensis Zorn, 2007
- Anomala butleri (Howden, 1955)
- Anomala butuana Ohaus, 1923
- Anomala buxtoni Ohaus, 1940
- Anomala caduca Ohaus, 1915
- Anomala caffra Burmeister, 1844
- Anomala calcarata Arrow, 1899
- Anomala calceuiformis Huang & Lu, 2024
- Anomala callifera Ohaus, 1938
- Anomala calpurnia Ohaus, 1923
- Anomala calymmophora Ohaus, 1916
- Anomala camarinensis Ohaus, 1910
- Anomala canisia Ohaus, 1925
- Anomala cantori (Hope, 1839)
- Anomala cantorioides Paulian, 1959
- Anomala capillula Lin, 1996
- Anomala carcina Ohaus, 1916
- Anomala cardinalis Ohaus, 1911
- Anomala cariniventris Lin, 2002
- Anomala carstenzorni Wang, 2020
- Anomala cassiana Ohaus, 1923
- Anomala castanea Fåhraeus, 1857
- Anomala castaneoventris (Bates, 1866)
- Anomala castelnaui Ohaus, 1910
- Anomala catenatopunctata Ohaus, 1910
- Anomala catochlora Ohaus, 1915
- Anomala celebica (Ohaus, 1936)
- Anomala ceramica Ohaus, 1936
- Anomala ceramopyga Ohaus, 1912
- Anomala cerea Arrow, 1906
- Anomala chalcescens Sharp, 1881
- Anomala chalcites Sharp, 1881
- Anomala chalcophysa (Ohaus, 1916)
- Anomala chalcoptera Burmeister, 1844
- Anomala chalybaea Burmeister, 1844
- Anomala chalybeipennis Benderitter, 1921
- Anomala chamaeleon Fairmaire, 1887
- Anomala chanleri Linell, 1896
- Anomala chenyilini Wang, 2021
- Anomala chlorocarpa Arrow, 1917
- Anomala chloroderma Arrow, 1913
- Anomala chloronota Arrow, 1911
- Anomala chlorophylla Arrow, 1917
- Anomala chloroptera Burmeister, 1844
- Anomala chloropus Arrow, 1917
- Anomala chloropyga Burmeister, 1844
- Anomala chlorosoma Arrow, 1917
- Anomala chlorotica (Guérin-Méneville, 1830)
- Anomala choui Lin, 1999
- Anomala chouwenyii Wang, 2021
- Anomala chrysochlora Arrow, 1917
- Anomala chrysochroma Arrow, 1917
- Anomala cicatricosa (Perty, 1830)
- Anomala ciliatipes Arrow, 1917
- Anomala cinderella Arrow, 1917
- Anomala cingulata Ohaus, 1911
- Anomala cirroides Ohaus, 1916
- Anomala citrina Lansberge, 1883
- Anomala cladera Ohaus, 1912
- Anomala clarescens Ohaus, 1936
- Anomala clerica Arrow, 1917
- Anomala clodia Ohaus, 1925
- Anomala clypeata Arrow, 1899
- Anomala cobala Ohaus, 1916
- Anomala cochlearia Ohaus, 1932
- Anomala coffea Filippini, Galante & Micó, 2015
- Anomala cognata Zorn, 2011
- Anomala coiffaiti Machatschke, 1971
- Anomala collotra Zhang & Lin, 2008
- Anomala colluta Péringuey, 1902
- Anomala colma Ohaus, 1924
- Anomala colobocaula Ohaus, 1916
- Anomala comma Arrow, 1917
- Anomala communis (Burmeister, 1844)
- Anomala concavifronta Lin, 1999
- Anomala concha Ohaus, 1916
- Anomala concinna Burmeister, 1844
- Anomala conformis Walker, 1859
- Anomala confrater Zorn, Kobayashi & Wada, 2017
- Anomala conjuga (Arrow, 1901)
- Anomala connectens Arrow, 1917
- Anomala conradti Bates, 1889
- Anomala consanguinea Zhao, 2019
- Anomala constanti Limbourg & Zorn, 2010
- Anomala constricta Ohaus, 1915
- Anomala contenta Kolbe, 1897
- Anomala controversa Hope, 1842
- Anomala convexa Benderitter, 1927
- Anomala coolsi Limbourg, 2005
- Anomala corpulenta Motschulsky, 1854 (Copper Green Chafer)
- Anomala corrugata Bates, 1866
- Anomala corruscans (Chevrolat, 1841)
- Anomala corvina Arrow, 1917
- Anomala costulata Fairmaire, 1887
- Anomala coxalis Bates, 1891
- Anomala crassa (Benderitter, 1923)
- Anomala crassipyga Benderitter, 1923
- Anomala crassiuscula Machatschke, 1964
- Anomala cribrata (Blanchard, 1851)
- Anomala crinifrons Ohaus, 1936
- Anomala cruralis Fairmaire, 1887
- Anomala crypsinoa Ohaus, 1916
- Anomala cucusa Ohaus, 1923
- Anomala cuprascens (Wiedemann, 1823)
- Anomala cuprea (Hope, 1839) (Cupreous Chafer)
- Anomala cupreovariolosa Filippini, Galante & Micó, 2014
- Anomala cupripes (Hope, 1839) (Large Green Chafer)
- Anomala cupritarsis Benderitter, 1928
- Anomala cupriventris (Ohaus, 1924)
- Anomala curata Benderitter, 1928
- Anomala curator Benderitter, 1929
- Anomala curva Benderitter, 1922
- Anomala cyanipennis Lin, 1999
- Anomala cyclops Filippini, Galante & Micó, 2015
- Anomala cypriochalcea Ohaus, 1916
- Anomala cypriogastra Ohaus, 1938
- Anomala czorni Prokofiev, 2015
- Anomala daimiana Harold, 1877
- Anomala dairamensis Zorn, 2011
- Anomala dalatensis Frey, 1971
- Anomala dalbergiae Arrow, 1917
- Anomala dalmanni (Gyllenhal, 1817)
- Anomala damara Péringuey, 1902
- Anomala daniorum Zorn, 2011
- Anomala dapitana Ohaus, 1915
- Anomala dasypyga Burmeister, 1844
- Anomala dawnensis Arrow, 1917
- Anomala dayaoshanensis Wang, 2020
- Anomala decorata Kirsch, 1875
- Anomala delagoa Péringuey, 1902
- Anomala delavayi Fairmaire, 1886
- Anomala deliana Ohaus, 1916
- Anomala delkeskampi Machatschke, 1972
- Anomala deltoides Lin, 1999
- Anomala densa Arrow, 1917
- Anomala densepunctata Frey, 1971
- Anomala denticrus (Ohaus, 1910)
- Anomala denticulata Zorn, 2007
- Anomala dentifera Lin, 2002
- Anomala deserta Ohaus, 1932
- Anomala desiccata Arrow, 1917
- Anomala despumata Ohaus, 1910
- Anomala detunei Limbourg, 2002
- Anomala devia Brancsik, 1910
- Anomala devota (Rossi, 1790)
- Anomala diabla Potts, 1976
- Anomala diana Zhang & Lin, 2008
- Anomala dianopicta Zhao, 2021
- Anomala dichromiceps Prokofiev, 2012
- Anomala diehli Zorn, 1998
- Anomala digitata Frey, 1976
- Anomala diglossa Ohaus, 1916
- Anomala dilatata Arrow, 1917
- Anomala dilatostilus Zhao, Fujioka & Zorn, 2025
- Anomala dimidiata (Hope, 1831)
- Anomala diplopsyla Prokofiev, 2015
- Anomala discalis Walker, 1859
- Anomala discordabilis Dohrn, 1876
- Anomala discors (Karsch, 1882)
- Anomala discrepans Arrow, 1915
- Anomala disparilis Arrow, 1899
- Anomala dissimilis Zorn, 1998
- Anomala distanti Arrow, 1899
- Anomala distinguenda (Blanchard, 1851)
- Anomala dita Péringuey, 1902
- Anomala diurna Ohaus, 1938
- Anomala diversicolor Ohaus, 1916
- Anomala diversipennis Arrow, 1917
- Anomala divisa Filippini, Galante & Micó, 2015
- Anomala djampeana Ohaus, 1915
- Anomala dohertyi Zorn, 2011
- Anomala dolichophalla Prokofiev, 2015
- Anomala dongi Wang, 2021
- Anomala dorsalis (Fabricius, 1775)
- Anomala dorsata Fåhraeus, 1857
- Anomala dorsopicta Arrow, 1912
- Anomala dorsosignata Ohaus, 1916
- Anomala dossidea Ohaus, 1925
- Anomala drusilla Ohaus, 1925
- Anomala dubia (Scopoli, 1763)
- Anomala ducarmei Limbourg, 2019
- Anomala dudleyi Limbourg, 2003
- Anomala dulongensis Zhao, 2025
- Anomala durvillei Zorn, 2007
- Anomala dussumieri (Blanchard, 1851)
- Anomala ebenina Fairmaire, 1886
- Anomala ecbolima Ohaus, 1915
- Anomala echinata Zorn, 2011
- Anomala eckhardti Ohaus, 1897
- Anomala edentula Ohaus, 1925
- Anomala egregia Gahan, 1896
- Anomala eksae Prokofiev & Zorn, 2015
- Anomala elberti Ohaus, 1911
- Anomala elongata Benderitter, 1922
- Anomala emortualis (Blanchard, 1851)
- Anomala encausta Candèze, 1869
- Anomala enganensis Ohaus, 1916
- Anomala ennia Ohaus, 1925
- Anomala erosa Arrow, 1912
- Anomala errans (Fabricius, 1775)
- Anomala ertli Ohaus, 1911
- Anomala erubescens Ohaus, 1925
- Anomala esakii Sawada, 1950
- Anomala esmeralda Prokofiev, 2013
- Anomala estrella Filippini, Galante & Micó, 2015
- Anomala etnaensis Zorn, 2011
- Anomala eucardia Frey, 1976
- Anomala eumyops Ohaus, 1925
- Anomala euops Arrow, 1917
- Anomala eventifera Zorn, 1998
- Anomala exanthematica Ohaus, 1914
- Anomala exaratior Ohaus, 1924
- Anomala excolens Ohaus, 1916
- Anomala exigua Péringuey, 1908
- Anomala exilis Zorn, 2000
- Anomala eximia Potts, 1976
- Anomala exitialis Péringuey, 1902
- Anomala exoleta Faldermann, 1835
- Anomala exoletoides Lin, 2000
- Anomala expallescens Ohaus, 1941
- Anomala expansa (Bates, 1866)
- Anomala expedita Ohaus, 1914
- Anomala fallaciosa Arrow, 1917
- Anomala fasciolata Ohaus, 1925
- Anomala fausta Ohaus, 1919
- Anomala felicia Arrow, 1910
- Anomala femoralis (Olivier, 1789)
- Anomala fenestrata Zhao, Fujioka & Zorn, 2025
- Anomala fenghuae Wang & Zorn, 2025
- Anomala fergussonensis Zorn, 2007
- Anomala ferrea Filippini, Galante & Micó, 2014
- Anomala ferruginea Marseul, 1867
- Anomala fibula Ohaus, 1916
- Anomala filigera Ohaus, 1933
- Anomala fissilabris Arrow, 1912
- Anomala fissula Ohaus, 1916
- Anomala flagellata Sharp, 1881
- Anomala flavacoma Filippini, Mico & Galante, 2013
- Anomala flaveola Burmeister, 1844
- Anomala flaviana Ohaus, 1919
- Anomala flavilimbata Lin, 2002
- Anomala flavipunctuata Lin, 1999
- Anomala flaviventris Arrow, 1912
- Anomala flavofasciata Arrow, 1912
- Anomala flavofemorata Lin, 1989
- Anomala flavoguttata Miyake, 2000
- Anomala flavolineata Zorn, 1998
- Anomala flavonotata Arrow, 1912
- Anomala flavopicta Arrow, 1912
- Anomala flavoscutellata Ohaus, 1910
- Anomala flavovaria Arrow, 1917
- Anomala florina Ohaus, 1916
- Anomala foliacea Ohaus, 1916
- Anomala forbesi Bates, 1884
- Anomala forcipalis Ohaus, 1910
- Anomala fracta (Walker, 1859)
- Anomala francottei Sabatinelli, 1997
- Anomala freyi Machatschke, 1972
- Anomala friedrichi Limbourg, Dekoninck & Seidel, 2024
- Anomala fukiensis Machatschke, 1955
- Anomala fulvescens Candèze, 1869
- Anomala fulvia Ohaus, 1919
- Anomala fulvocalceata Ohaus, 1916
- Anomala fulvofusca Ohaus, 1915
- Anomala fulvohirta Arrow, 1915
- Anomala fulvopicea Ohaus, 1928
- Anomala funebris Arrow, 1906
- Anomala furcula Ohaus, 1916
- Anomala fuscaoaerea Ohaus, 1927
- Anomala fuscicauda Lin, 1999
- Anomala fusciceps Fåhraeus, 1857
- Anomala fuscoaenea Benderitter, 1921
- Anomala fuscosignata Ohaus, 1905
- Anomala fuscovelata Ohaus, 1938
- Anomala fuscoviridis Hombron & Jacquinot, 1846
- Anomala fuscula Sharp, 1881
- Anomala fusitibia Lin, 1992
- Anomala gaja Ohaus, 1930
- Anomala gallana Ohaus, 1925
- Anomala ganganensis Machatschke, 1955
- Anomala gemelloprasina Prokofiev, 2015
- Anomala geniculata (Motschulsky, 1866)
- Anomala gentilis Machatschke, 1975
- Anomala ghindana Ohaus, 1938
- Anomala glabra Lin, 1981
- Anomala glaseri Chalumeau, 1985
- Anomala goergeni Limbourg, 2005
- Anomala gordiana Ohaus, 1932
- Anomala gracilenta Reitter, 1903
- Anomala grandis (Hope, 1839)
- Anomala granulata Benderitter, 1927
- Anomala granulicauda Lin, 1989
- Anomala granuliformis Lin, 1996
- Anomala grassei Machatschke, 1971
- Anomala graueri Ohaus, 1911
- Anomala gravida Arrow, 1911
- Anomala grossepunctata Zorn, 2011
- Anomala gualberta Ohaus, 1925
- Anomala gudzenkoi Jacobson, 1903
- Anomala guessfeldi Kolbe, 1883
- Anomala gymenti Keith, 2019
- Anomala gypaeetus Prokofiev, 2015
- Anomala haliaeetus Prokofiev, 2013
- Anomala hamigera Ohaus, 1915
- Anomala hamuliphalla Prokofiev, 2021
- Anomala hamulitibia Zorn, Zhao & P. Pham, 2026
- Anomala handschini Ohaus, 1934
- Anomala harpagophysa Prokofiev, 2014
- Anomala hassoni Limbourg, 2007
- Anomala hebescens Ohaus, 1915
- Anomala hebridarum Ohaus, 1916
- Anomala hemiseca Zhang & Lin, 2008
- Anomala herbacea Zorn, Kobayashi & Wada, 2017
- Anomala hesychastria Ohaus, 1912
- Anomala heterocostata Heller, 1898
- Anomala heteroglypha Ohaus, 1910
- Anomala heterostigma Ohaus, 1915
- Anomala heterotricha Ohaus, 1916
- Anomala hilaria Ohaus, 1925
- Anomala hirsutoides Lin, 1996
- Anomala hirsutula Nonfried, 1892
- Anomala hirtidorsa Lin, 1999
- Anomala hirtipyga Benderitter, 1924
- Anomala hoabinhensis Zorn, Zhao & P. Pham, 2026
- Anomala holomelaena Bates, 1891
- Anomala hondurae (Nonfried, 1891)
- Anomala hopei Kirsch, 1875
- Anomala hoplites Ohaus, 1938
- Anomala hoplocosmeta Ohaus, 1925
- Anomala hortensia (Ohaus, 1927)
- Anomala hualienensis Zhao, 2022
- Anomala huangguiqiangi Wang, 2021
- Anomala huangjianbini Wang, 2021
- Anomala huangyuzhoui Zhao, 2021
- Anomala humeralis Burmeister, 1844
- Anomala hygina Ohaus, 1925
- Anomala hymenalis Ohaus, 1916
- Anomala hymenoptera Ohaus, 1916
- Anomala igniceps Arrow, 1917
- Anomala ignicolor Reitter, 1903
- Anomala ignipes Lin, 1996
- Anomala ikuthana Ohaus, 1941
- Anomala illusa Arrow, 1911
- Anomala immatura Boheman, 1860
- Anomala immeliorata Zorn, Kobayashi & Wada, 2017
- Anomala imperfecta Ohaus, 1915
- Anomala imperialis Arrow, 1899
- Anomala imperspicabilis Zorn, Kobayashi & Wada, 2017
- Anomala impressicollis Zorn, 2011
- Anomala inclinata Zhao & Zorn, 2022
- Anomala inconcinna Bates, 1866
- Anomala inconsueta Ohaus, 1910
- Anomala incurva Zhao, Fujioka & Zorn, 2025
- Anomala indistincta Arrow, 1917
- Anomala inepta Ohaus, 1916
- Anomala inexpecta Zorn, 1998
- Anomala infans Ohaus, 1910
- Anomala infantilis Arrow, 1911
- Anomala inguinalis Ohaus, 1915
- Anomala inopinata Ohaus, 1914
- Anomala insipida Lansberge, 1886
- Anomala insitiva Robinson, 1938 (Iridescent Anomala)
- Anomala insulicola Lin, 2000
- Anomala interna Harold, 1878
- Anomala interrupta Lin, 2002
- Anomala intrusa Péringuey, 1902
- Anomala irianensis Zorn, 2007
- Anomala irideorufa Fairmaire, 1893
- Anomala iridicollis Ohaus, 1914
- Anomala ishidai Niijima & Kinoshita, 1927
- Anomala ismeria Ohaus, 1925
- Anomala itohi Miyake, 1987
- Anomala itoi Miyake, 1994
- Anomala iwasei Miyake, 1994
- Anomala jacobsoni (Ohaus, 1914)
- Anomala jansoni Ohaus, 1897
- Anomala javana Ohaus, 1915
- Anomala jeanvoinei Benderitter, 1929
- Anomala jocosa Ohaus, 1925
- Anomala jokoana Machatschke, 1972
- Anomala kalliesi Zorn, 1998
- Anomala kaltengensis Zorn, 2007
- Anomala kameruna Ohaus, 1925
- Anomala kannegieteri Ohaus, 1924
- Anomala kanshireiensis Zorn & Zhao, 2022
- Anomala kapangana Ohaus, 1936
- Anomala kapiriensis Benderitter, 1921
- Anomala katherine Jin, Weir, Slipinski & Pang, 2014
- Anomala katsurai Miyake, 1996
- Anomala keiana Ohaus, 1915
- Anomala keithi Zorn, 2011
- Anomala keniae Ohaus, 1911
- Anomala keralensis Frey, 1975
- Anomala ketambeana Zorn, 1998
- Anomala kigonserae Ohaus, 1925
- Anomala kinabalensis Ohaus, 1910
- Anomala kindiae Machatschke, 1972
- Anomala kintaroi Miyake, 1996
- Anomala kirgisica Borodin, 1915
- Anomala knapperti Ohaus, 1916
- Anomala kochi Machatschke, 1972
- Anomala kokodae Ohaus, 1936
- Anomala koreana Kim, 1997
- Anomala koulango Limbourg, Dekoninck & Seidel, 2024
- Anomala kristenseni Ohaus, 1912
- Anomala krivani Limbourg, 2005
- Anomala kuatuna (Machatschke, 1955)
- Anomala kudatina Ohaus, 1916
- Anomala kuehni Ohaus, 1916
- Anomala kuekenthali Zorn, 2007
- Anomala laccata Zhang & Lin, 2008
- Anomala laeta Arrow, 1917
- Anomala laetabilis Ohaus, 1915
- Anomala laevigata Blanchard, 1851
- Anomala laevisulcata Fairmaire, 1888
- Anomala lamdongica Prokofiev, 2012
- Anomala langbianensis Zorn, 2011
- Anomala laniventris Arrow, 1912
- Anomala lanthasmena Prokofiev, 2026
- Anomala laosensis Frey, 1970
- Anomala laotica Frey, 1969
- Anomala lasikina Ohaus, 1914
- Anomala lasiocnemis (Ohaus, 1930)
- Anomala latefemorata (Ohaus, 1910)
- Anomala latericostulata Lin, 1992
- Anomala lateripila Lin, 2002
- Anomala laticlypea Lin, 1999
- Anomala latifasciata Zhao, Fujioka & Zorn, 2025
- Anomala latipes Arrow, 1912
- Anomala latiuscula Péringuey, 1908
- Anomala leonfairmairei Zorn, 2004
- Anomala leotaudi Blanchard, 1851
- Anomala leprodes Ohaus, 1916
- Anomala leptopoda Lin, 1992
- Anomala levilinea Prokofiev, 2021
- Anomala lhoba Zhao, Fujioka & Zorn, 2025
- Anomala libidinosa Ohaus, 1916
- Anomala lieftincki Zorn, 2011
- Anomala lignea Arrow, 1917
- Anomala limata Candèze, 1869
- Anomala limatipennis Ohaus, 1916
- Anomala limbifera Ohaus, 1915
- Anomala limbipennis Ohaus, 1938
- Anomala limbourgi Zorn, 2011
- Anomala limon Filippini, Micó & Galante, 2016
- Anomala lineata Benderitter, 1922
- Anomala lineatopennis (Blanchard, 1851)
- Anomala linelli Ohaus, 1916
- Anomala linwenhsini Zhao & Zorn, 2022
- Anomala lipodes Ohaus, 1916
- Anomala lissopyga Ohaus, 1924
- Anomala liuhaoyii Zhao, 2025
- Anomala livia Ohaus, 1925
- Anomala loi Kobayashi, 1987
- Anomala longicarcarata Lin, 2002
- Anomala longiclypea Lin, 1999
- Anomala longicornis Lin, 1999
- Anomala longidentata Zorn, 2011
- Anomala longilamina Lin, 1999
- Anomala longilobata Zhao & Zorn, 2022
- Anomala lucasi Guérin-Méneville, 1847
- Anomala lucens Ballion, 1871
- Anomala luciae Blanchard, 1851
- Anomala lucida Klug, 1855
- Anomala lucidula (Guérin-Méneville, 1830)
- Anomala luctuosa Lansberge, 1879
- Anomala luculenta Erichson, 1848
- Anomala ludgera Ohaus, 1938
- Anomala lujae Ohaus, 1911
- Anomala luminosa Benderitter, 1929
- Anomala luniclypealis Lin, 1979
- Anomala luoyuensis Zhao, Fujioka & Zorn, 2025
- Anomala luridicollis Arrow, 1911
- Anomala lutea Klug, 1855
- Anomala luticolor Ohaus, 1925
- Anomala luwukensis Zorn, 2011
- Anomala machatschkei Frey, 1972
- Anomala macrophalla Ohaus, 1923
- Anomala macrophthalma Ohaus, 1910
- Anomala macrophylla (Wiedemann, 1823)
- Anomala macrorhynchos Prokofiev, 2021
- Anomala maculicollis Hombron & Jacquinot, 1846
- Anomala maculifemorata Ohaus, 1912
- Anomala maculipyga Benderitter, 1930
- Anomala madangensis Zorn, 2007
- Anomala madrasica Arrow, 1917
- Anomala maedai Zhao, Fujioka & Zorn, 2025
- Anomala mahakamensis Zorn, 2007
- Anomala malabariensis (Blanchard, 1851)
- Anomala malaisei Paulian, 1959
- Anomala malayensis Zorn, 1998
- Anomala malivirens Prokofiev, 2021
- Anomala malukana Zorn, 2007
- Anomala mancipulla Prokofiev, 2015
- Anomala mandli Machatschke, 1972
- Anomala manguliana Ohaus, 1936
- Anomala manseri Zorn, 2007
- Anomala manuselensis Zorn, 2011
- Anomala margina Lin, 1999
- Anomala marginipennis Arrow, 1912
- Anomala martini (Hope, 1839)
- Anomala masaakii Nomura, 1977
- Anomala mascula Zorn, 2005
- Anomala matangensis Zorn, 2007
- Anomala mathildae Machatschke, 1972
- Anomala matricula Ohaus, 1916
- Anomala matsumurai Sawada, 1950
- Anomala matzenaueri Reitter, 1918
- Anomala mausonica Zorn, 2011
- Anomala medogensis Wang, 2021
- Anomala megalonyx Ohaus, 1925
- Anomala megaparamera Filippini, Mico & Galante, 2013
- Anomala meggitti Ohaus, 1935
- Anomala melanogastra Ohaus, 1913
- Anomala melattia Ohaus, 1924
- Anomala melitta Ohaus, 1923
- Anomala menadensis Ohaus, 1924
- Anomala menadocola (Burgeon, 1932)
- Anomala menghaiensis Wang, 2024
- Anomala menyuensis Zhao, Fujioka & Zorn, 2025
- Anomala merkli Zorn, 2007
- Anomala mersa Filippini, Galante & Micó, 2015
- Anomala merula Arrow, 1917
- Anomala mesosticta Filippini, Galante & Micó, 2015
- Anomala metella Ohaus, 1923
- Anomala metonidia Reitter, 1903
- Anomala micanticollis Benderitter, 1928
- Anomala micholitzi Ohaus, 1913
- Anomala microda Zhang & Lin, 2008
- Anomala micronyx Benderitter, 1927
- Anomala millestriga Bates, 1891
- Anomala millingeni Paulian, 1959
- Anomala mimikensis Zorn, 2011
- Anomala minahassae Ohaus, 1916
- Anomala minangorum Zorn, 1998
- Anomala minima Ohaus, 1897
- Anomala ministrans Ohaus, 1916
- Anomala minutissima Frey, 1975
- Anomala miokoana Ohaus, 1916
- Anomala mirabilis Zorn, 1998
- Anomala mirita Ohaus, 1930
- Anomala misandria Ohaus, 1916
- Anomala miyakona Nomura, 1977
- Anomala mizusawai Kobayashi, 1987
- Anomala modesta Benderitter, 1922
- Anomala mollis Arrow, 1917
- Anomala monachula Ohaus, 1916
- Anomala mongolica Faldermann, 1835
- Anomala monochroa (Bates, 1891)
- Anomala monogramma Zorn, 2011
- Anomala montana Lin, 1996
- Anomala morettoi Limbourg, 2010
- Anomala morissaei (Blanchard, 1851)
- Anomala motschulskyi Harold, 1877
- Anomala muchei Mikšić, 1960
- Anomala multistriata (Motschulsky, 1861)
- Anomala munda Benderitter, 1928
- Anomala muongtensis Zhao & Pham, 2023
- Anomala muricata Ohaus, 1930
- Anomala murphyi Limbourg, 2012
- Anomala murzini Zhao, Fujioka & Zorn, 2025
- Anomala mus Arrow, 1911
- Anomala mutans (Blanchard, 1851)
- Anomala myanmarensis Keith, 2008
- Anomala myriospila Lin, 2002
- Anomala mystica Arrow, 1917
- Anomala nainitalii Shah, 1983
- Anomala nanlingensis Zhao, Zorn & Liu, 2024
- Anomala nathani Frey, 1971
- Anomala neglecta Zorn, 1998
- Anomala nepalensis Machatschke, 1966
- Anomala nerissa (Ohaus, 1930)
- Anomala nervulata Paulian, 1959
- Anomala nezha Wang, 2020
- Anomala niasiana Ohaus, 1916
- Anomala nigrescens (Ohaus, 1914)
- Anomala nigripes Nonfried, 1892
- Anomala nigriventris Benderitter, 1921
- Anomala nigrocincta Benderitter, 1928
- Anomala nigroflava Filippini, Galante & Micó, 2014
- Anomala nigrolineata Kobayashi, 1987
- Anomala nigromarginata Ohaus, 1938
- Anomala nigroscripta Arrow, 1917
- Anomala nigroscutellata Benderitter, 1929
- Anomala nigrosellata Ohaus, 1905
- Anomala nigrosulcata Candèze, 1869
- Anomala nigrosuturata Benderitter, 1924
- Anomala nigrovaria Arrow, 1917
- Anomala nigrovestita Arrow, 1899
- Anomala nigrovirens Reitter, 1894
- Anomala niijimae Ohaus, 1925
- Anomala niisatoi (Kobayashi & Fujioka, 2013)
- Anomala nikodymi Zorn, 1998
- Anomala nilgirensis Arrow, 1917
- Anomala nipsanensis Zorn, 2011
- Anomala noctibibo Prokofiev, 2015
- Anomala noctivaga Ohaus, 1910
- Anomala nocturna Ohaus, 1930
- Anomala nomurai Kobayashi, 1995
- Anomala nona Ohaus, 1916
- Anomala novoguineensis Ohaus, 1916
- Anomala nubeculosa Ohaus, 1905
- Anomala nvwa Wang, 2020
- Anomala nycterina Ohaus, 1936
- Anomala obbiana Ohaus, 1939
- Anomala obesa Candèze, 1869
- Anomala obliquipunctata Lin, 1989
- Anomala obliquisulcata Lin, 2002
- Anomala obscurata Reitter, 1903
- Anomala obscuripes Fairmaire, 1892
- Anomala obscuroaenea Fairmaire, 1887
- Anomala obsoleta (Blanchard, 1851)
- Anomala obtusicollis Arrow, 1917
- Anomala ochii Miyake, 1987
- Anomala octiescostata (Burmeister, 1844)
- Anomala odila Ohaus, 1925
- Anomala oedematosa Ohaus, 1916
- Anomala oehleri Zorn, 2011
- Anomala ogloblini Medvedev, 1949
- Anomala ohmomoi Miyake, Yamaguchi & Aoki, 2002
- Anomala okapaensis Zorn, 2011
- Anomala okushimai Zorn, Kobayashi & Wada, 2017
- Anomala oleaginea Ménétriés, 1836
- Anomala olivacea (Gyllenhal, 1817)
- Anomala olivea Lin, 2002
- Anomala olivieri Sharp, 1903
- Anomala opacicollis Péringuey, 1902
- Anomala opaconigra Frey, 1972
- Anomala opalina Fairmaire, 1887
- Anomala ophthalmica Zorn, 2007
- Anomala ordinata Zorn, Kobayashi & Wada, 2017
- Anomala orichalcescens Ohaus, 1916
- Anomala osakana Sawada, 1942
- Anomala osmanlis Blanchard, 1851
- Anomala ovalis Burmeister, 1844
- Anomala ovampoa Péringuey, 1902
- Anomala ovatula Ohaus, 1910
- Anomala oxiana Semenov, 1891
- Anomala oxylabis Ohaus, 1916
- Anomala pacholatkoi Zorn, 2011
- Anomala pagana Burmeister, 1844
- Anomala palaestina Pic, 1905
- Anomala palawana Ohaus, 1910
- Anomala pallens (Semenov & Medvedev, 1949)
- Anomala palleola (Gyllenhal, 1817)
- Anomala palleopyga (Benderitter, 1923)
- Anomala pallida (Fabricius, 1775)
- Anomala pallidula (Latreille, 1823)
- Anomala palopona Ohaus, 1926
- Anomala panamensis Ohaus, 1902
- Anomala papuensis Zorn, 2007
- Anomala papuna Arrow, 1917
- Anomala parallela Benderitter, 1929
- Anomala paralucidula Zorn, 2011
- Anomala paramychodes Prokofiev, 2021
- Anomala parastasioides Zorn, 2007
- Anomala parca Péringuey, 1902
- Anomala pardalina Ohaus, 1908
- Anomala parotidea (Ohaus, 1910)
- Anomala peguensis Arrow, 1917
- Anomala pellucida Arrow, 1911
- Anomala pemako Zhao, 2025
- Anomala penai Frey, 1968
- Anomala pendleburyi Ohaus, 1932
- Anomala perakensis Ohaus, 1933
- Anomala perplexa (Hope, 1839)
- Anomala personata Ohaus, 1932
- Anomala pertinax Péringuey, 1908
- Anomala phaeogastra Ohaus, 1925
- Anomala phaeoloma Ohaus, 1925
- Anomala phagedaenica Ohaus, 1916
- Anomala phalaena Ohaus, 1915
- Anomala phantasma Uliana, Tomasi & Gallerati, 2023
- Anomala phanthietica Prokofiev, 2015
- Anomala phimotica Ohaus, 1930
- Anomala phlyctenopyga Ohaus, 1915
- Anomala phodopyga Ohaus, 1930
- Anomala phthysica Péringuey, 1902
- Anomala phuquocica Prokofiev, 2013
- Anomala phyllis Ohaus, 1925
- Anomala phyllochroma Ohaus, 1916
- Anomala pictipes Arrow, 1917
- Anomala pilicauda Lin, 2002
- Anomala pilifrons Lin, 1979
- Anomala piliscutella Lin, 1981
- Anomala pilosella Fairmaire, 1898
- Anomala pinguis Péringuey, 1896
- Anomala piruensis Zorn, 2011
- Anomala placida (Benderitter, 1927)
- Anomala plagiata (Burmeister, 1855)
- Anomala planata Candèze, 1869
- Anomala planelytra Paulian, 1959
- Anomala planicauda Lin, 1996
- Anomala planicorna Lin, 1996
- Anomala platypyga Fairmaire, 1893
- Anomala plebeja (Olivier, 1789)
- Anomala plectrophora Ohaus, 1916
- Anomala pleuritica Ohaus, 1915
- Anomala plurisulcata Benderitter, 1930
- Anomala polina Ohaus, 1923
- Anomala polita (Blanchard, 1851)
- Anomala polyanor Ohaus, 1916
- Anomala pomona Arrow, 1917
- Anomala ponticula Ohaus, 1915
- Anomala pontualei Sabatinelli, 1997
- Anomala porcia Ohaus, 1930
- Anomala porovatula Ohaus, 1915
- Anomala porrecta Zorn, 2011
- Anomala posterior Harold, 1869
- Anomala potanini Medvedev, 1949
- Anomala praeclara Paulian, 1959
- Anomala praecoxalis Ohaus, 1914
- Anomala praematura Ohaus, 1910
- Anomala praenitens Arrow, 1917
- Anomala praetendinosa Ohaus, 1925
- Anomala prasinicollis Bates, 1891
- Anomala priapituba Prokofiev, 2026
- Anomala prisca Ohaus, 1915
- Anomala probativa Péringuey, 1902
- Anomala procrastinator Arrow, 1917
- Anomala proctolasia Ohaus, 1910
- Anomala profundisulca Lin, 2002
- Anomala projecta Lin, 2002
- Anomala prolixa Arrow, 1910
- Anomala propinqua Arrow, 1912
- Anomala prudentia Ohaus, 1919
- Anomala pseudoclarescens Zorn, 2011
- Anomala pseudoeucoma Filippini, Mico & Galante, 2013
- Anomala ptenomeloides Ohaus, 1916
- Anomala pubescens Blatchley, 1910
- Anomala pubifera Machatschke, 1969
- Anomala pudica Benderitter, 1923
- Anomala pulchripes Lansberge, 1879
- Anomala pumilis Ohaus, 1932
- Anomala pumiloides Zorn, 2007
- Anomala punctatissima Frey, 1970
- Anomala puncticeps (Casey, 1915)
- Anomala puncticlypea Lin, 1992
- Anomala punctipennis (Benderitter, 1924)
- Anomala punctulicollis Fairmaire, 1893
- Anomala purpureiventris Lansberge, 1883
- Anomala pygidialis Kirsch, 1876
- Anomala pyricollis Zorn, 2011
- Anomala pyxexcavata Zhang & Lin, 2008
- Anomala pyxofera Zhang & Lin, 2008
- Anomala qiujianyueae Wang, 2020
- Anomala qiului Huang & Wang, 2019
- Anomala quadricalcarata Ohaus, 1924
- Anomala quadrigemina Arrow, 1910
- Anomala quadripartita Ohaus, 1916
- Anomala quadripunctata (Olivier, 1789)
- Anomala quelparta (Okamoto, 1924) (Jeju Beetle)
- Anomala rabdogastra Ohaus, 1930
- Anomala rantena Ohaus, 1926
- Anomala raphiocaula Ohaus, 1915
- Anomala raui Ohaus, 1914
- Anomala recordata Zorn, Kobayashi & Wada, 2017
- Anomala rectodonta Zorn, 2011
- Anomala regalis (Arrow, 1901)
- Anomala repensa Péringuey, 1902
- Anomala resplendens Fåhraeus, 1857
- Anomala rhodomela Arrow, 1917
- Anomala rhynchophalla Prokofiev, 2015
- Anomala ribbei Zorn, 2011
- Anomala richteri Ohaus, 1911
- Anomala ricovera Ohaus, 1925
- Anomala rigoberta Ohaus, 1925
- Anomala ritsemae Ohaus, 1916
- Anomala robinsoni Potts, 1974
- Anomala rojkoffi Limbourg, 2011
- Anomala ronana Ohaus, 1916
- Anomala rosenbergi Zorn, 2011
- Anomala rothschildti Ohaus, 1912
- Anomala rotundata Paulian, 1959
- Anomala rotundiceps Sharp, 1881
- Anomala rotundicollis Heller, 1898
- Anomala rubida Zorn, 2011
- Anomala rubra (Benderitter, 1923)
- Anomala rubricollis Lansberge, 1886
- Anomala rubripes Linnaeus, 1996
- Anomala ruficapilla Burmeister, 1855
- Anomala rufina Ohaus, 1919
- Anomala rufiventris Kollar & Redtenbacher, 1848
- Anomala rufocuprea Motschulsky, 1860 (Soy Bean Beetle)
- Anomala rufoides Limbourg, 2012
- Anomala rufopartita Fairmaire, 1889
- Anomala rufozonula Fairmaire, 1887
- Anomala rufula Machatschke, 1973
- Anomala rugiclypea Linnaeus, 1989
- Anomala ruginosa Ohaus, 1925
- Anomala rugipennis (Blanchard, 1851)
- Anomala rugosa Arrow, 1899
- Anomala rugulicollis Ohaus, 1936
- Anomala rugulipennis Lin, 1999
- Anomala russaticeps Fairmaire, 1888
- Anomala russiventris Fairmaire, 1893
- Anomala sabana Ohaus, 1916
- Anomala sabatinellii Zhao & Pham, 2023
- Anomala sabinae Potts, 1976
- Anomala saetipes Ohaus, 1916
- Anomala sagiens Ohaus, 1925
- Anomala saitoi Kobayashi, 1995
- Anomala sakaii Miyake, 1987
- Anomala samarensis Ohaus, 1923
- Anomala sambalanga Ohaus, 1938
- Anomala sampitana Ohaus, 1936
- Anomala sanchezi Ohaus, 1912
- Anomala sandersoni Howden, 1970
- Anomala sangirana Ohaus, 1915
- Anomala saopyga Ohaus, 1915
- Anomala sapa Miyake, 1994
- Anomala sapada Ohaus, 1916
- Anomala sarasinorum Ohaus, 1930
- Anomala sarawakensis Ohaus, 1910
- Anomala sarmiensis Zorn, 2007
- Anomala sassana Ohaus, 1925
- Anomala satulagi Zorn, 2011
- Anomala sauteri Ohaus, 1915
- Anomala sawahana Ohaus, 1926
- Anomala saya Ohaus, 1916
- Anomala scheepmakeri Lansberge, 1879
- Anomala schereri Frey, 1965
- Anomala schoenfeldti Ohaus, 1915
- Anomala schultzeana Ohaus, 1910
- Anomala scintillans Fairmaire, 1893
- Anomala scopas Ohaus, 1925
- Anomala sebakuana Péringuey, 1902
- Anomala semenovi Medvedev, 1949
- Anomala semiaenea Arrow, 1911
- Anomala semicastanea Fairmaire, 1888
- Anomala semicingulata Ohaus, 1914
- Anomala semicuprea Ohaus, 1916
- Anomala semilla Filippini, Galante & Micó, 2014
- Anomala seminigra Lansberge, 1883
- Anomala seminitens Arrow, 1917
- Anomala semiovalis Lin, 2002
- Anomala semipurpurea Burmeister, 1855
- Anomala semiserrata Wang, 2022
- Anomala semiusta Arrow, 1912
- Anomala semivirens (Gyllenhal, 1817)
- Anomala semperiana Ohaus, 1910
- Anomala sempronia (Ohaus, 1930)
- Anomala senegalensis (Blanchard, 1851)
- Anomala sentaniensis Zorn, 2011
- Anomala separata Brancsik, 1897
- Anomala sericangula Ohaus, 1925
- Anomala sericipennis Lin, 2002
- Anomala seticrus Ohaus, 1912
- Anomala sexmaculata Benderitter, 1921
- Anomala shimenensis Lin, 2000
- Anomala shirakii Nomura, 1959
- Anomala siamensis (Nonfried, 1891)
- Anomala sibilensis Zorn, 2011
- Anomala sibuyana Ohaus, 1923
- Anomala siccana Machatschke, 1969
- Anomala sieboldi (Hope, 1839)
- Anomala sieversi Heyden, 1887
- Anomala silama Arrow, 1910
- Anomala simalurensis (Ohaus, 1914)
- Anomala similis Lansberge, 1882
- Anomala similopyga Miyake, 1987
- Anomala singularis Arrow, 1917
- Anomala sinica Arrow, 1915
- Anomala sinifrater Prokofiev, 2021
- Anomala siniopyga Ohaus, 1916
- Anomala smaragdina Eschscholtz, 1822
- Anomala smetsi Limbourg & Zorn, 2010
- Anomala snizeki Zorn, 2007
- Anomala solida Erichson, 1847
- Anomala solisi Filippini, Galante & Micó, 2014
- Anomala somalina Machatschke, 1969
- Anomala songhaitiani Wang, 2021
- Anomala sordidula Sharp, 1881
- Anomala soror Arrow, 1910
- Anomala spatuliformis Lin, 2002
- Anomala spiloptera Burmeister, 1855
- Anomala spilopteroides Ohaus, 1914
- Anomala spiniforceps Zhao, Fujioka & Zorn, 2025
- Anomala splendida Ménétriés, 1832
- Anomala stalmansi Limbourg, 2007
- Anomala stempelmanni Ohaus, 1914
- Anomala stenodera Arrow, 1917
- Anomala sternitica Ohaus, 1936
- Anomala stictopyga Ohaus, 1915
- Anomala stigmaticollis Fairmaire, 1891
- Anomala stigmipennis Ohaus, 1916
- Anomala straminea Semenov, 1891
- Anomala strigodermoides Filippini, Galante & Micó, 2015
- Anomala studiosa (Benderitter, 1924)
- Anomala suavis Potts, 1976
- Anomala subita Zorn, 2000
- Anomala sublunalis Lin, 2002
- Anomala subpilosa Lin, 1996
- Anomala subterfulva Ohaus, 1936
- Anomala subterfusca Ohaus, 1916
- Anomala subtomentella Lin, 1996
- Anomala subtrinata Lin, 1996
- Anomala subvittata Reitter, 1903
- Anomala sucki Ohaus, 1916
- Anomala sudanensis Machatschke, 1972
- Anomala suklina Ohaus, 1938
- Anomala sulana Zorn, 2007
- Anomala sulcatula Burmeister, 1844
- Anomala sulcipennis (Faldermann, 1835)
- Anomala sulcithorax Ohaus, 1925
- Anomala sulcithoraxoides Limbourg, 2019
- Anomala sulselensis Zorn, 2011
- Anomala sumatrensis (Zorn, 2000)
- Anomala superflua Arrow, 1911
- Anomala surigana Ohaus, 1923
- Anomala susca Ohaus, 1924
- Anomala suturalis Lansberge, 1886
- Anomala taeniana Zhang & Lin, 2008
- Anomala tahunensis Zorn, 2007
- Anomala taiwana Kobayashi, 1987
- Anomala tamchuc Zorn, Zhao & P. Pham, 2026
- Anomala takasagoensis (Sawada, 1941)
- Anomala takeshii Sabatinelli, 1997
- Anomala tarowana (Sawada, 1941)
- Anomala tawetana Machatschke, 1970
- Anomala tendinosa Gerstaecker, 1867
- Anomala tenimberiana Burgeon, 1932
- Anomala tenimbrica Ohaus, 1936
- Anomala tentaculata Wang, 2024
- Anomala teretina Ohaus, 1932
- Anomala tetanotricha Ohaus, 1916
- Anomala tetracrana Ohaus, 1916
- Anomala thai Miyake, 1994
- Anomala thailandiana Miyake, Yamaguchi & Akiyama, 2002
- Anomala thoracica (Zubkov, 1833)
- Anomala thoracophora Ohaus, 1916
- Anomala tibialis Schaeffer, 1906 (tibial scarab)
- Anomala tigibiensis Zorn, 2011
- Anomala timida Ohaus, 1916
- Anomala tincticeps Arrow, 1917
- Anomala tinctipennis Arrow, 1917
- Anomala tinctiventris Quedenfeldt, 1884
- Anomala tingis Zhao, 2025
- Anomala tolerata Péringuey, 1902
- Anomala toliensis Ohaus, 1916
- Anomala tortilis Zorn, Zhao & P. Pham, 2026
- Anomala toxopei Zorn, 2007
- Anomala trabeata Fairmaire, 1891
- Anomala transvalensis Arrow, 1899
- Anomala transversa Lin, 1999
- Anomala triancistris Lin, 1999
- Anomala triangularis Schönfeldt, 1890
- Anomala trichia Benderitter, 1922
- Anomala trichonota Ohaus, 1936
- Anomala trichophora Ohaus, 1925
- Anomala trichopyga Ohaus, 1915
- Anomala tricolorea Ohaus, 1915
- Anomala triformis Prokofiev, 2021
- Anomala trigonopyga Ohaus, 1912
- Anomala trillesi Paulian, 1959
- Anomala tristigma Reitter, 1903
- Anomala tristis Arrow, 1917
- Anomala trivirgata Fairmaire, 1888
- Anomala trochanterica Arrow, 1917
- Anomala truncata Bates, 1890
- Anomala tryptica Ohaus, 1916
- Anomala ueleana Benderitter, 1928
- Anomala ukerewia Kolbe, 1913
- Anomala ulcerata Ohaus, 1915
- Anomala umboniformis Ohaus, 1916
- Anomala uncata Zorn, 2005
- Anomala uncinata Ohaus, 1916
- Anomala unicolor (Olivier, 1789)
- Anomala unicornis Zorn, 2011
- Anomala unilineata Filippini, Galante & Micó, 2015
- Anomala usambarica Machatschke, 1974
- Anomala usambica Kolbe, 1897
- Anomala ustulata Arrow, 1899 (Pestiferous Leaf Chafer)
- Anomala ustulatipes Fairmaire, 1887
- Anomala uvirae Benderitter, 1930
- Anomala vaga Benderitter, 1929
- Anomala validipes Arrow, 1917
- Anomala varians (Olivier, 1789)
- Anomala varicolor (Gyllenhal, 1817)
- Anomala variegata Hope, 1831
- Anomala variivestis Arrow, 1917
- Anomala vatillum Zorn, 2005
- Anomala vellicata Ohaus, 1915
- Anomala velutina Benderitter, 1922
- Anomala ventriosa Ohaus, 1911
- Anomala venusta Benderitter, 1928
- Anomala vestigator Arrow, 1917
- Anomala vethi Ohaus, 1914
- Anomala vetula (Wiedemann, 1821) (Cape Turf Chafer)
- Anomala vietipennis Ohaus, 1910
- Anomala vietnamica Miyake, 1996
- Anomala vigilax Ohaus, 1924
- Anomala violaceipennis Blanchard, 1851
- Anomala virens Lin, 1996
- Anomala viridana (Kolbe, 1886)
- Anomala viridiaenea Machatschke, 1971
- Anomala viridibrunnea Zorn, 1998
- Anomala viridicostata Nonfried, 1892
- Anomala viridimicans Benderitter, 1929
- Anomala viridis (Fabricius, 1775)
- Anomala viridisericea Ohaus, 1905
- Anomala vitalisi Ohaus, 1914
- Anomala vitis (Fabricius, 1775) (Vine Chafer)
- Anomala vittata Gebler, 1841
- Anomala vitticollis Lansberge, 1886
- Anomala vittilatera Arrow, 1917
- Anomala vivax Benderitter, 1923
- Anomala vivida Arrow, 1917
- Anomala volanda Ohaus, 1923
- Anomala volsellata Filippini, Galante & Micó, 2014
- Anomala vorstmanni (Heller, 1891)
- Anomala vuilletae Paulian, 1959
- Anomala wahnesi Ohaus, 1926
- Anomala walkeri Arrow, 1899
- Anomala wallacei Zorn, 2011
- Anomala wangpengi Wang, 2020
- Anomala wapiensis Frey, 1971
- Anomala warkapiensis Zorn, 2011
- Anomala waterstraati Ohaus, 1916
- Anomala weberi Ohaus, 1916
- Anomala wellmani Ohaus, 1907
- Anomala wenyiae Wang & Zorn, 2025
- Anomala werneri Limbourg, 2003
- Anomala weyersi Ohaus, 1916
- Anomala whiteheadi Arrow, 1910
- Anomala windrathi Nonfried, 1891
- Anomala winkleri Ohaus, 1911
- Anomala wituensis Machatschke, 1969
- Anomala wutaiensis Zhao & Zorn, 2022
- Anomala xanthochroma Arrow, 1917
- Anomala xantholoma Lin, 1981
- Anomala xanthopleura Arrow, 1913
- Anomala xanthoptera (Blanchard, 1851)
- Anomala xanthopyga Ohaus, 1915
- Anomala xanthorrhoea Prokofiev, 2013
- Anomala xestopyga Ohaus, 1915
- Anomala xiongi Wang & Zorn, 2021
- Anomala xuhaoi Huang & Wang, 2019
- Anomala xuyunchuani Wang, 2020
- Anomala yanxui Wang, 2022
- Anomala yemaoi Wang, 2022
- Anomala yersini Prokofiev, 2013
- Anomala yunnana Fairmaire, 1886
- Anomala yunxianensis Wang, 2020
- Anomala zambesicola Péringuey, 1902
- Anomala zavattarii (Gridelli, 1939)
- Anomala zerekoreensis Machatschke, 1955
- Anomala zhengyucheni Zhao, Zorn & Liu, 2024
- Anomala zhouzhengi Wang, 2020
- Anomala zornella Prokofiev, 2015
- Anomala zumbadoi Filippini, Galante & Micó, 2014
- Euchlora viridana Guérin, 1831
- † Anomala amblobelia Zhang, 1989
- † Anomala brachytarsia Zhang, Sun & Zhang, 1994
- † Anomala endoxa Zhang, Sun & Zhang, 1994
- † Anomala eversa Zhang, 1989
- † Anomala exterranea Wickham, 1914
- † Anomala fugax Heer, 1862
- † Anomala furva (Hong & Wang, 1983)
- † Anomala laokayensis Prokofiev, 2024
- † Anomala lochmocola Zhang, 1989
- † Anomala martyi Piton & Théobald, 1939
- † Anomala orcina Zhang, Sun & Zhang, 1994
- † Anomala primigenia Heyden & Heyden, 1866
- † Anomala punctulata Zhang, 1989
- † Anomala scia Zhang, 1989
- † Anomala scudderi Wickham, 1914
- † Anomala synemosyna Zhang, 1989
- † Anomala thetis Heyden & Heyden, 1866
- † Anomala tumulata Heyden & Heyden, 1866
- † Anomala ursa Zhang, Sun & Zhang, 1994
