= Anomala longilobata =

Scientific classification
- Kingdom: Animalia
- Phylum: Arthropoda
- Clade: Pancrustacea
- Class: Insecta
- Order: Coleoptera
- Suborder: Polyphaga
- Infraorder: Scarabaeiformia
- Family: Scarabaeidae
- Genus: Anomala
- Species: A. longilobata

Binomial name
- Anomala longilobata Zhao & Zorn, 2022

Species of beetle

Anomala longilobata is a species of beetle in the family Scarabaeidae. It was described by Ming-Zhi Zhao and Carsten Zorn in 2022. It is endemic to Hainan, China.

== Etymology ==
The species is named after the Latin prefix “longi-” and the adjective “lobatus, -a, -um”, alluding to the slender and lobed lower branch of paramere.

== Description ==
Males measure 13.7–14.4 mm (0.54–0.57 in) in length and 7.8–8.3 mm (0.31–0.33 in) in width. Females measure 14.4–15.4 mm (0.57–0.61 in) in length and 8.7–9.1 mm (0.34–0.36 in) in width. The body is elongated ovoid and strongly convex in shape. Male coloration is highly variable and varies from green, reddish green, yellowish or reddish brown and purplish black to coal black. Females are yellowish brown with greenish sheen and weak metallic luster.

== Distribution ==
This species is only known from Hainan.
