= Anomala kanshireiensis =

Scientific classification
- Kingdom: Animalia
- Phylum: Arthropoda
- Clade: Pancrustacea
- Class: Insecta
- Order: Coleoptera
- Suborder: Polyphaga
- Infraorder: Scarabaeiformia
- Family: Scarabaeidae
- Genus: Anomala
- Species: A. kanshireiensis

Binomial name
- Anomala kanshireiensis Zorn & Zhao, 2022

Species of beetle

Anomala kanshireiensis is a species of beetle in the family Scarabaeidae. It was described by Ming-Zhi Zhao and Carsten Zorn in 2022. It is endemic to Taiwan.

== Etymology ==
The species is named after the historical name of the type locality, Kanshirei (=Guanziling).

== Description ==
Males measure 11.5–13.0 mm (0.45–0.51 in) in length and 6.5–7.5 mm (0.26–0.30 in) in width. Females measure 12.3–13.0 mm (0.48–0.51 in) in length and 7.0–7.9 mm (0.28–0.31 in) in width. The body is elongated ovoid in shape. Coloration is dark reddish brown.

== Distribution ==
This species is only known from Tainan, Taiwan.
