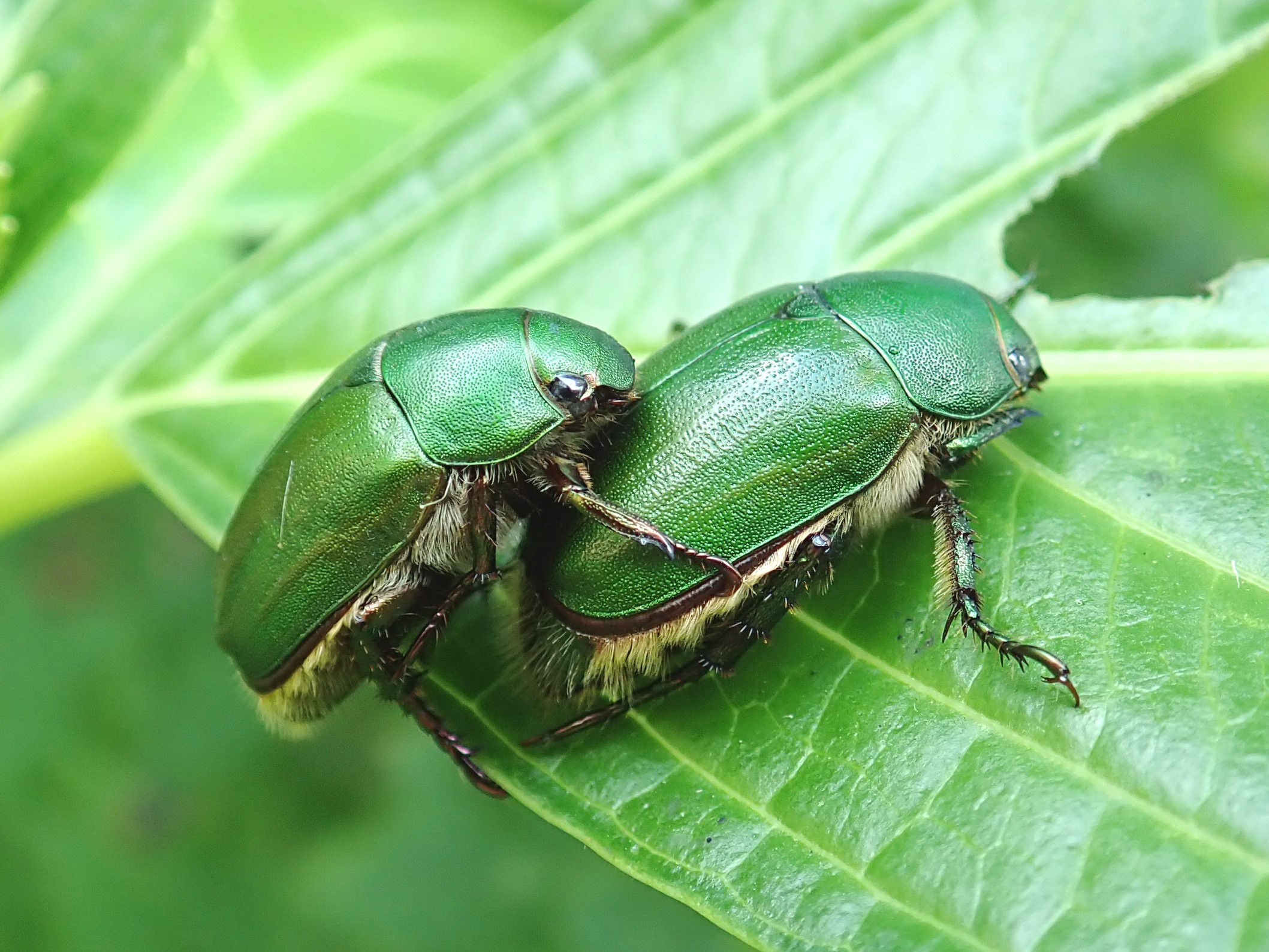

Scientific classification
- Kingdom: Animalia
- Phylum: Arthropoda
- Clade: Pancrustacea
- Class: Insecta
- Order: Coleoptera
- Suborder: Polyphaga
- Infraorder: Scarabaeiformia
- Family: Scarabaeidae
- Genus: Anomala
- Species: A. albopilosa

Binomial name
- Anomala albopilosa (Hope, 1839)

Synonyms
- Anomala puncticollis Harold, 1877; Euchlora albopilosa Hope, 1839

= Anomala albopilosa =

Species of beetle

Anomala albopilosa, known by the common names green chafer, white-haired leaf chafer and sugarcane white grub, is a species of chafer beetle in the family Scarabaeidae. It was originally described in the genus Euchlora by Frederick William Hope in 1839. The beetle is native to Japan（the three major islands (Kyushu, Shikoku and Honshu ) and the Ryukyu Islands）, Korea, and Taiwan.
