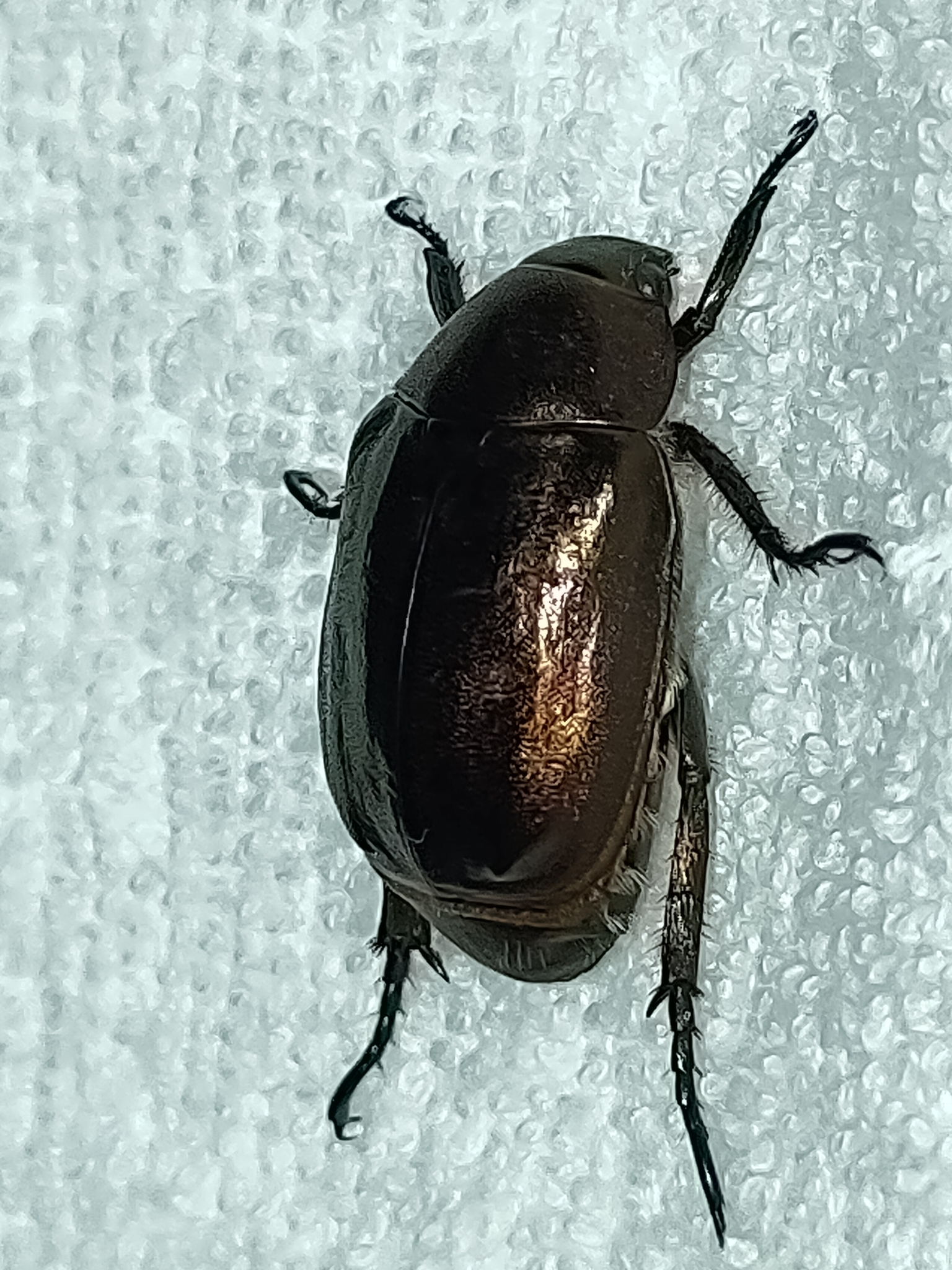

Scientific classification
- Kingdom: Animalia
- Phylum: Arthropoda
- Clade: Pancrustacea
- Class: Insecta
- Order: Coleoptera
- Suborder: Polyphaga
- Infraorder: Scarabaeiformia
- Family: Scarabaeidae
- Genus: Anomala
- Species: A. cuprea

Binomial name
- Anomala cuprea (Hope, 1839)
- Distribution Native range

= Anomala cuprea =

Species of insect

Anomala cuprea, also known by its common name cupreous chafer, is a species from the genus Anomala.

== Description ==
Anomala cuprea is a nocturnal scarab beetle active at night and feeds on flowers and leaves. It has a wide-ranging diet, consuming various types of plants.

== Range ==
Anomala cuprea is native to Japan.
