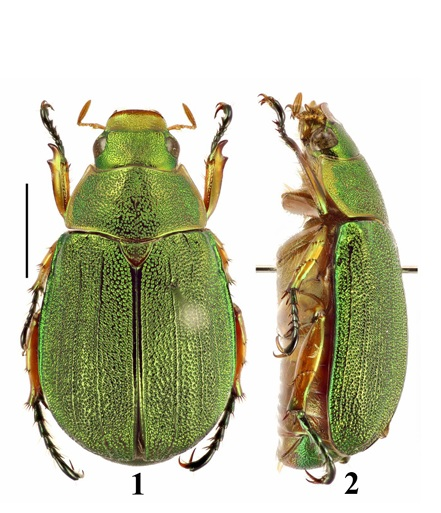

Scientific classification
- Kingdom: Animalia
- Phylum: Arthropoda
- Clade: Pancrustacea
- Class: Insecta
- Order: Coleoptera
- Suborder: Polyphaga
- Infraorder: Scarabaeiformia
- Family: Scarabaeidae
- Genus: Anomala
- Species: A. tingis

Binomial name
- Anomala tingis Zhao, 2025

= Anomala tingis =

Species of beetle

Anomala tingis is a species of beetle of the Scarabaeidae family. This species is found in China (Guangdong, Guangxi, Hainan).

Adults reach a length of 16.8–18.7 mm (males) and 14.7–18.4 mm (females). They are generally yellowish brown, with grass green areas.

== Etymology ==
Tingis is the type genus of the lace bugs, Tingidae. It refers to the similar dorsal sculpture.
