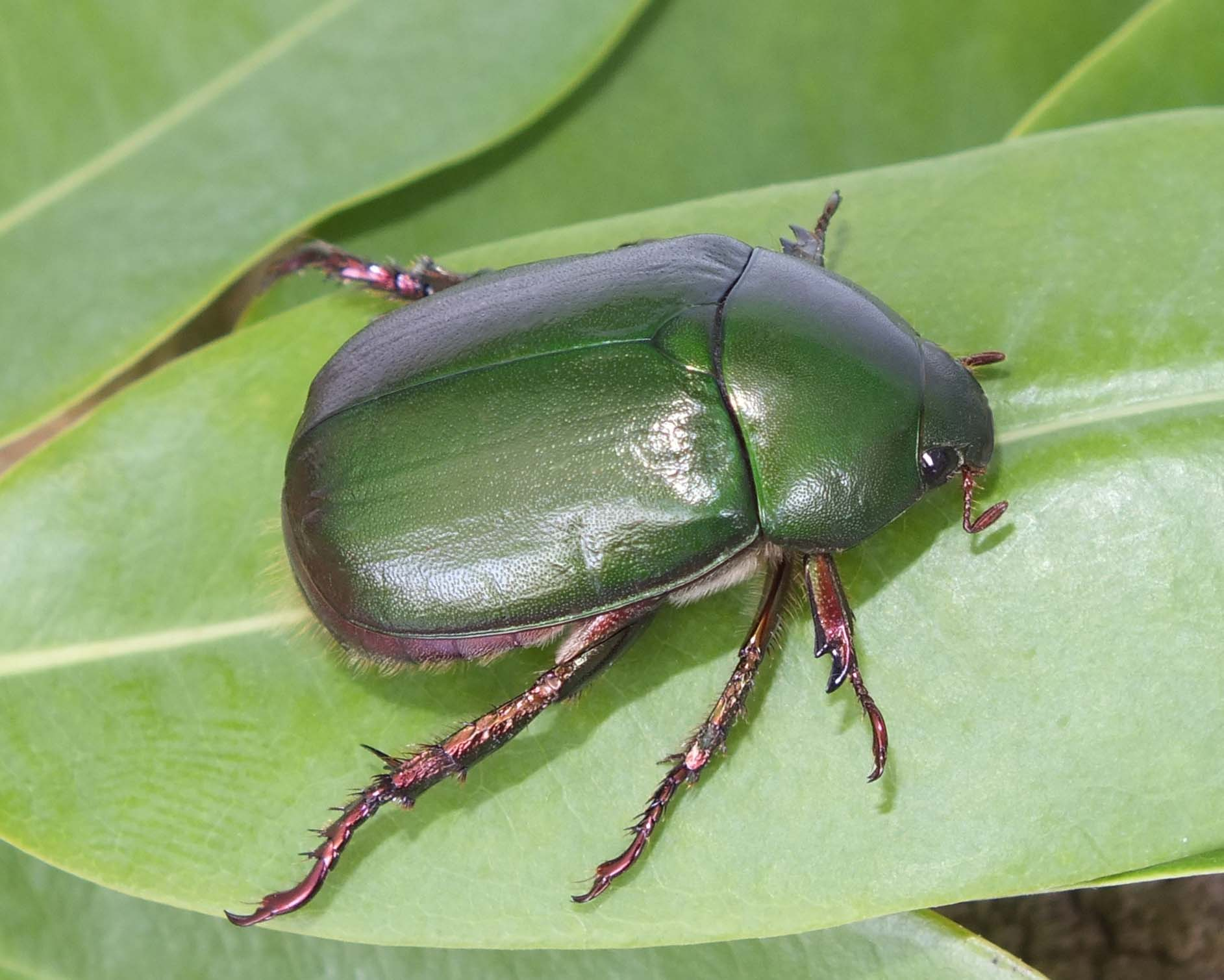

Scientific classification
- Kingdom: Animalia
- Phylum: Arthropoda
- Clade: Pancrustacea
- Class: Insecta
- Order: Coleoptera
- Suborder: Polyphaga
- Infraorder: Scarabaeiformia
- Family: Scarabaeidae
- Genus: Anomala
- Species: A. dimidiata

Binomial name
- Anomala dimidiata (Hope, 1831)

= Anomala dimidiata =

Species of beetle

Anomala dimidiata is a species of scarab beetle. It is a pest of millets.
