= Anomala fracta =

Scientific classification
- Kingdom: Animalia
- Phylum: Arthropoda
- Clade: Pancrustacea
- Class: Insecta
- Order: Coleoptera
- Suborder: Polyphaga
- Infraorder: Scarabaeiformia
- Family: Scarabaeidae
- Genus: Anomala
- Species: A. fracta

Binomial name
- Anomala fracta (Walker, 1859)

Synonyms
- Omaloplia fracta Walker, 1859

Species of beetle

Anomala fracta is a species of beetle of the family Scarabaeidae. It is found in Sri Lanka.

== Description ==
They are testaceous and shiny, with a green, very densely punctate head. The thorax is densely punctate, with a green disk. The elytra punctate-stiated, with green markings.
