= Anomala digitata =

Scientific classification
- Kingdom: Animalia
- Phylum: Arthropoda
- Clade: Pancrustacea
- Class: Insecta
- Order: Coleoptera
- Suborder: Polyphaga
- Infraorder: Scarabaeiformia
- Family: Scarabaeidae
- Genus: Anomala
- Species: A. digitata

Binomial name
- Anomala digitata Frey, 1976

Species of beetle

Anomala digitata is a species of beetle of the family Scarabaeidae. It is found in Somalia.

== Description ==
Adults reach a length of about 12 mm (0.47 in). The head is uniformly blackish-brown, while the pronotum, elytra, pygidium, and underside are brown, and the hind tibiae and all tarsi are dark. The tip of the pygidium and thorax are light brown, sparsely pubescent, but otherwise glabrous. The pronotum is dull, but the rest of the upper surface is glossy.
