= Anomala wutaiensis =

Scientific classification
- Kingdom: Animalia
- Phylum: Arthropoda
- Clade: Pancrustacea
- Class: Insecta
- Order: Coleoptera
- Suborder: Polyphaga
- Infraorder: Scarabaeiformia
- Family: Scarabaeidae
- Genus: Anomala
- Species: A. wutaiensis

Binomial name
- Anomala wutaiensis Zhao & Zorn, 2022

Species of beetle

Anomala wutaiensis is a species of beetle in the family Scarabaeidae. It was described by Ming-Zhi Zhao and Carsten Zorn in 2022. It is endemic to Taiwan.

== Etymology ==
The species is named after Wutai Township, where the type series was collected.

== Description ==
Males measure 12.0–14.0 mm (0.47–0.55 in) in length and 6.7–7.6 mm (0.26–0.30 in) in width. Females measure 12.3–13.9 mm (0.48–0.55 in) in length and 6.8–8.1 mm (0.27–0.32 in) in width. The body is elongated ovoid in shape. Males are reddish brown while females are dark brown to blackish brown.

== Distribution ==
This species is only known from Pingtung, Taiwan.
