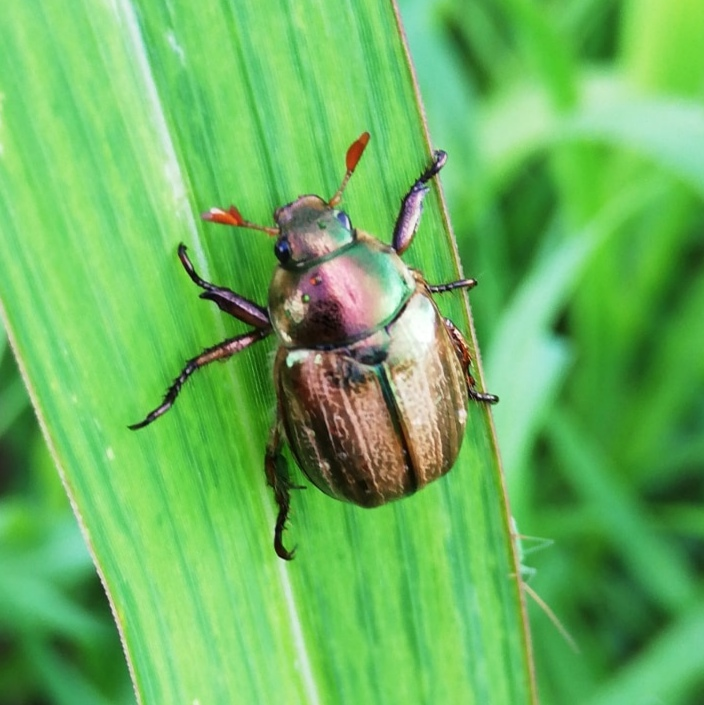

Scientific classification
- Kingdom: Animalia
- Phylum: Arthropoda
- Clade: Pancrustacea
- Class: Insecta
- Order: Coleoptera
- Suborder: Polyphaga
- Infraorder: Scarabaeiformia
- Family: Scarabaeidae
- Genus: Anomala
- Species: A. vitis

Binomial name
- Anomala vitis Fabricius, 1775

Synonyms
- List: Anomala variabilisSchilsky, 1888; Anomala vitis azurescens Reitter, 1903; Anomala vitis cupreonitens Bau, 1883; Anomala vitis dichroa Reitter, 1903; Anomala vitis fuscipennis Ohaus, 1915; Anomala vitis lutea Schilsky, 1888; Anomala vitis pseudoazurescens Dellacasa, 1970; Anomala vitis pseudosignata Dellacasa, 1970; Anomala vitis signata Schilsky, 1888; Anomala vitis viridicollis Schilsky, 1888; Melolontha holosericea Illiger, 1805

= Anomala vitis =

Species of beetle

Anomala vitis, the vine chafer, is a species of scarab (beetle of the family Scarabaeidae). It has a palearctic distribution. Like many Anomala species, it is regarded as a pest of agricultural crops, in this case grapevines.
