= Anomala insitiva =

Scientific classification
- Kingdom: Animalia
- Phylum: Arthropoda
- Clade: Pancrustacea
- Class: Insecta
- Order: Coleoptera
- Suborder: Polyphaga
- Infraorder: Scarabaeiformia
- Family: Scarabaeidae
- Genus: Anomala
- Species: A. insitiva

Binomial name
- Anomala insitiva Robinson, 1938

Species of beetle

Anomala insitiva is a species of shining leaf chafer in the family of beetles known as Scarabaeidae.
