= Anomala hualienensis =

Scientific classification
- Kingdom: Animalia
- Phylum: Arthropoda
- Clade: Pancrustacea
- Class: Insecta
- Order: Coleoptera
- Suborder: Polyphaga
- Infraorder: Scarabaeiformia
- Family: Scarabaeidae
- Genus: Anomala
- Species: A. hualienensis

Binomial name
- Anomala hualienensis Zhao, 2022

Species of beetle

Anomala hualienensis is a species of beetle in the family Scarabaeidae. It was described by Ming-Zhi Zhao in 2022. It is endemic to Taiwan.

== Etymology ==
The species is named after Hualien County, where the type material was collected.

== Description ==
Males measure 14.6–16.4 mm (0.57–0.65 in) in length and 7.6–8.3 mm (0.30–0.33 in) in width. Females measure 16.2–17.8 mm (0.64–0.70 in) in length and 8.8–9.3 mm (0.35–0.37 in) in width. The body is elongated ovoid and convex in shape. Coloration is metallic green, sometimes with distinct blue sheen. Females are bulkier and more convex than males.

== Distribution ==
This species is only known from Hualien, Taiwan.
