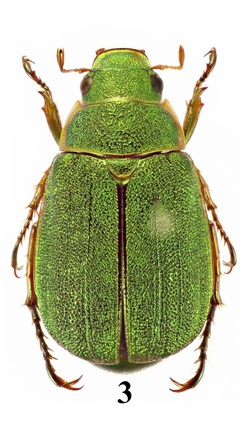

Scientific classification
- Kingdom: Animalia
- Phylum: Arthropoda
- Clade: Pancrustacea
- Class: Insecta
- Order: Coleoptera
- Suborder: Polyphaga
- Infraorder: Scarabaeiformia
- Family: Scarabaeidae
- Genus: Anomala
- Species: A. corrugata

Binomial name
- Anomala corrugata Bates, 1866

Synonyms
- Anomala holosericioides Niijima & Kinoshita, 1927

= Anomala corrugata =

Species of beetle

Anomala corrugata is a species of beetle of the Scarabaeidae family. This species is found in China (Anhui, Fujian, Guangdong, Guangxi, Hunan, Jiangxi, Zhejiang) and Taiwan.
