= Anomala sulcatula =

Scientific classification
- Kingdom: Animalia
- Phylum: Arthropoda
- Clade: Pancrustacea
- Class: Insecta
- Order: Coleoptera
- Suborder: Polyphaga
- Infraorder: Scarabaeiformia
- Family: Scarabaeidae
- Genus: Anomala
- Species: A. sulcatula

Binomial name
- Anomala sulcatula Burmeister, 1844

Species of chafer

Anomala sulcatula, commonly known as the Philippine chafer, is a species of shining leaf chafer in the genus Anomala. It is considered as a pest as its larvae feed on sugarcane, rice, corn and maize.

== Description ==
An adult Philippine chafer has an ovate body whose length ranges from 14-18 mm. It has a slightly metallic near-black brown color. The larva of a Philippine chafer has a C-shaped, cylindrical, white-colored body.

== Distribution ==
Anomala sulcatula is native to the Philippines but has been introduced to Guam, the northern Mariana Islands and Borneo as an invasive species.
