= Anomala linwenhsini =

Scientific classification
- Kingdom: Animalia
- Phylum: Arthropoda
- Clade: Pancrustacea
- Class: Insecta
- Order: Coleoptera
- Suborder: Polyphaga
- Infraorder: Scarabaeiformia
- Family: Scarabaeidae
- Genus: Anomala
- Species: A. linwenhsini

Binomial name
- Anomala linwenhsini Zhao & Zorn, 2022

Species of beetle

Anomala linwenhsini is a species of beetle in the family Scarabaeidae. It was described by Ming-Zhi Zhao and Carsten Zorn in 2022. It is endemic to Taiwan.

== Etymology ==
The species is named after Wen-Hsin Lin, who collected some of the type specimens.

== Description ==
Males measure 14.4–15.9 mm (0.57–0.63 in) in length and 7.7–8.5 mm (0.30–0.33 in) in width. A female measures 14.7 mm (0.58 in) in length and 8.2 mm (0.32 in) in width. The body is elongated ovoid in shape. Coloration is reddish brown.

== Distribution ==
This species is only known from Pingtung and Nantou, Taiwan.
