= Anomala inclinata =

Scientific classification
- Kingdom: Animalia
- Phylum: Arthropoda
- Clade: Pancrustacea
- Class: Insecta
- Order: Coleoptera
- Suborder: Polyphaga
- Infraorder: Scarabaeiformia
- Family: Scarabaeidae
- Genus: Anomala
- Species: A. inclinata

Binomial name
- Anomala inclinata Zhao & Zorn, 2022

Species of beetle

Anomala inclinata is a species of beetle in the family Scarabaeidae. It was described by Ming-Zhi Zhao and Carsten Zorn in 2022. It is endemic to Taiwan.

== Etymology ==
The species is named after the Latin adjective “inclinatus, -a, -um”, alluding to the inclined parameres of this species.

== Description ==
The holotype, a male, measures 13.0 mm (0.51 in) in length and 7.3 mm (0.29 in) in width. The paratype, a female, measures 13.5 mm (0.53 in) in length and 6.9 mm (0.27 in) in width. The body is elongated ovoid in shape. Coloration is blackish brown, with weak green metallic sheen.

== Distribution ==
This species is only known from Taitung, Taiwan.
