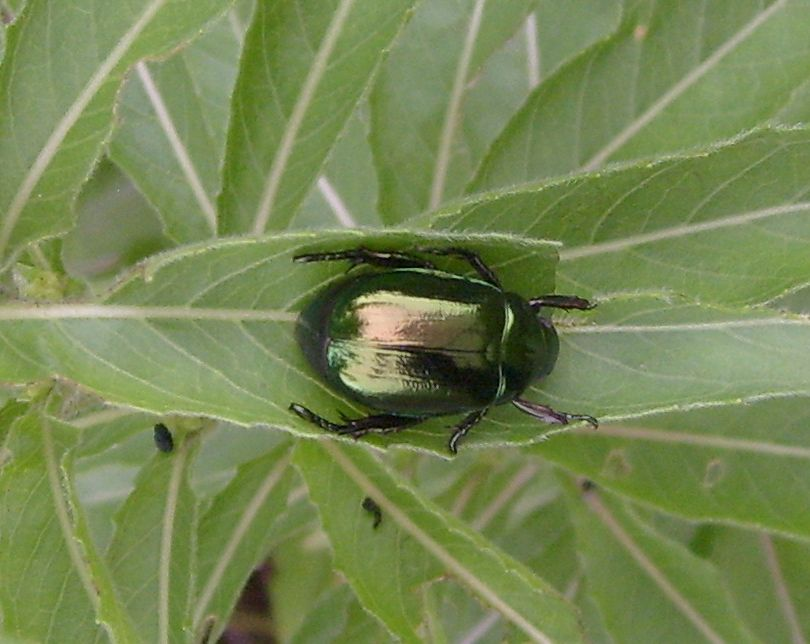
- Anomala mongolica

Scientific classification
- Kingdom: Animalia
- Phylum: Arthropoda
- Clade: Pancrustacea
- Class: Insecta
- Order: Coleoptera
- Suborder: Polyphaga
- Infraorder: Scarabaeiformia
- Family: Scarabaeidae
- Subfamily: Rutelinae
- Tribe: Anomalini
- Genus: Anomala; Samouelle, 1819

Diversity
- at least 1100 species

Synonyms
- Anomalepta Casey, 1915; Anomalopides Strand, 1928; Anomalopus Casey, 1915; Bifurcanomala Kim, 1998; Chejuanomala Kim, 1998; Choumala Kobayashi, 2008; Chrysoplethisa Reitter, 1903; Diplomala Reitter, 1903; Emphalena Reitter, 1903; Euchlora MacLeay, 1819; Euchronomala Reitter, 1903; Euporochlora Reitter, 1903; Euporomala Reitter, 1903; Hemispilota Casey, 1915; Idiocnema Faldermann, 1835; Idiocnemina Reitter, 1903; Illiola Semenov & Medvedev, 1949; Magniscarabaeus Hong & Wang, 1983; Mimela (Aprosterna) Hope, 1835; Nongoma Péringuey, 1902; Orphnomala Reitter, 1903; Paragematis Reitter, 1903; Phyllurga Gistel, 1848; Popillia (Peripopillia) Kolbe, 1894; Psammoscapheus Motschulsky, 1854; Pseudosinghala Heller, 1891; Rhombonalia Casey, 1915; Zaspilota Casey, 1915

= Anomala =

Genus of beetles

Anomala is a genus of shining leaf chafers in the scarab beetle family Scarabaeidae. There are more than 1,100 described species in Anomala, found in every continent except Antarctica.

A common characteristic behavior of beetles in Anomala is that most grubs of these species feed on the roots of grasses, becoming a pest in many areas where they invade. One notable species is the Oriental beetle (Anomala orientalis), which was introduced to North America and has since become a major pest in several mid-Atlantic states.

== See also ==
- List of Anomala species
