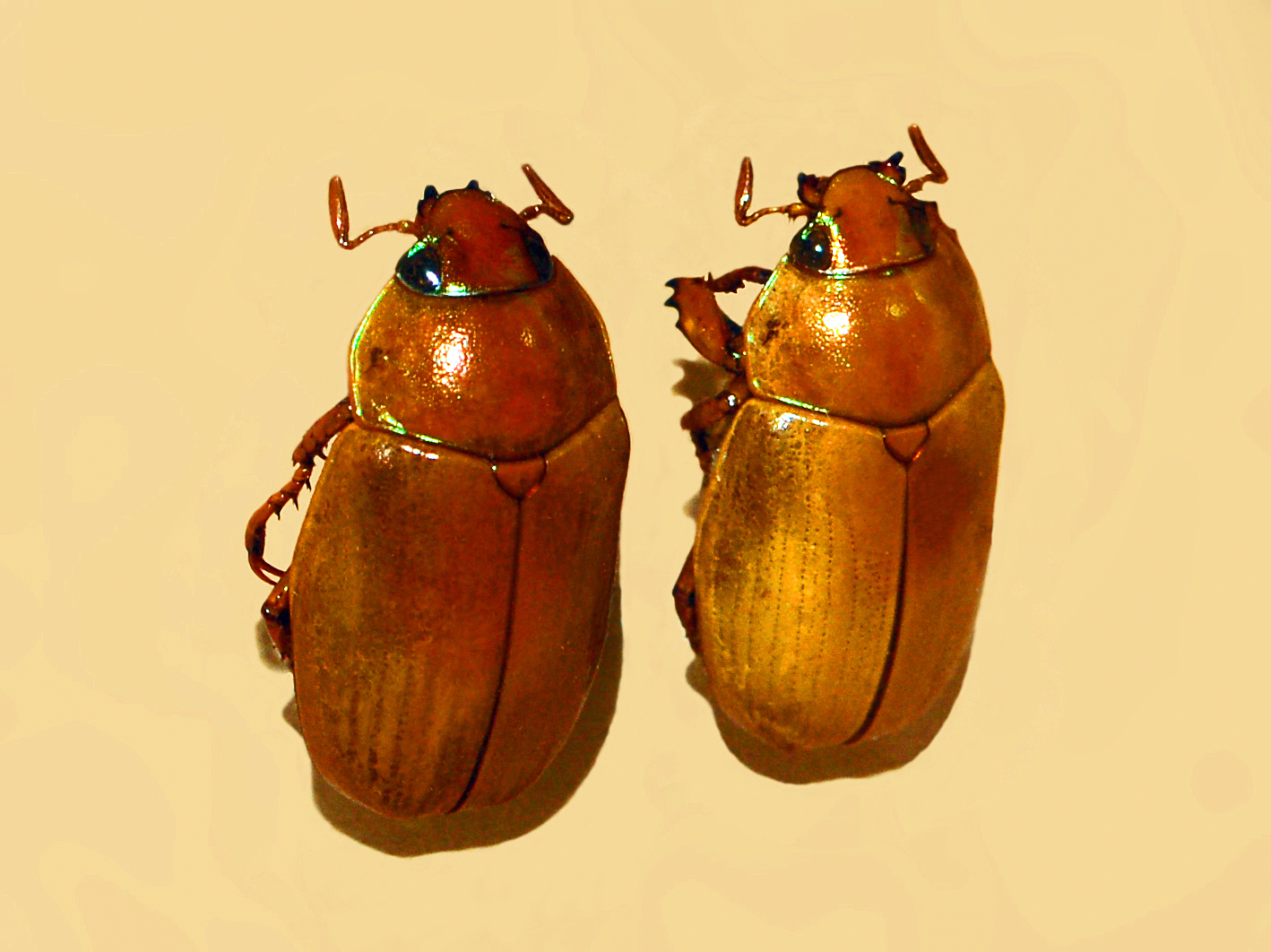
- Pelidnota virescens from Guatemala

Scientific classification
- Kingdom: Animalia
- Phylum: Arthropoda
- Class: Insecta
- Order: Coleoptera
- Suborder: Polyphaga
- Infraorder: Scarabaeiformia
- Family: Scarabaeidae
- Genus: Pelidnota
- Species: P. virescens

Binomial name
- Pelidnota virescens Burmeister, 1844

= Pelidnota virescens =

Species of beetle

Pelidnota virescens is a species of beetle of the family Scarabaeidae.

== Description ==
Pelidnota virescens reaches a length of about 22–26 millimetres (0.87–1.02 in). Head, pronotum and legs usually are yellow or metallic green, while elyra are yellowish and longitudinally striated. Exterior borders of mandibles are deeply indented. Adults are nocturnal and feed on various trees, while larvae feed on rotten stumps.

== Distribution ==
This species occurs in Mexico and Central America.
