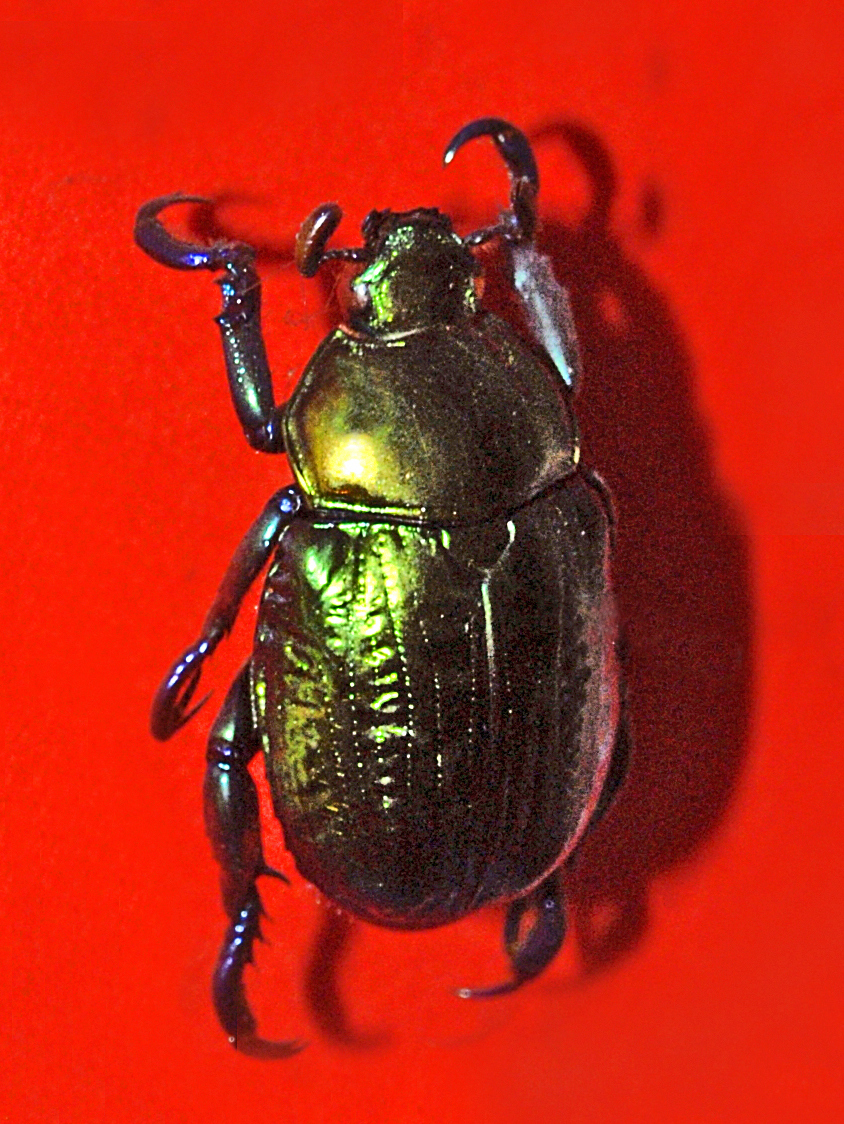
- Museum specimen of Pelidnota sumptuosa

Scientific classification
- Domain: Eukaryota
- Kingdom: Animalia
- Phylum: Arthropoda
- Class: Insecta
- Order: Coleoptera
- Suborder: Polyphaga
- Infraorder: Scarabaeiformia
- Family: Scarabaeidae
- Genus: Pelidnota
- Species: P. sumptuosa

Binomial name
- Pelidnota sumptuosa Vigors, 1825

= Pelidnota sumptuosa =

Species of beetle

Pelidnota sumptuosa is a species of beetles of the family Scarabaeidae.

== Description ==
Pelidnota burmeisteri can reach a body length of about 15 millimetres (0.59 in). Head, pronotum and elytra are completely shining metallic green.

== Distribution ==
This species occurs in Brazil and Paraguay.
