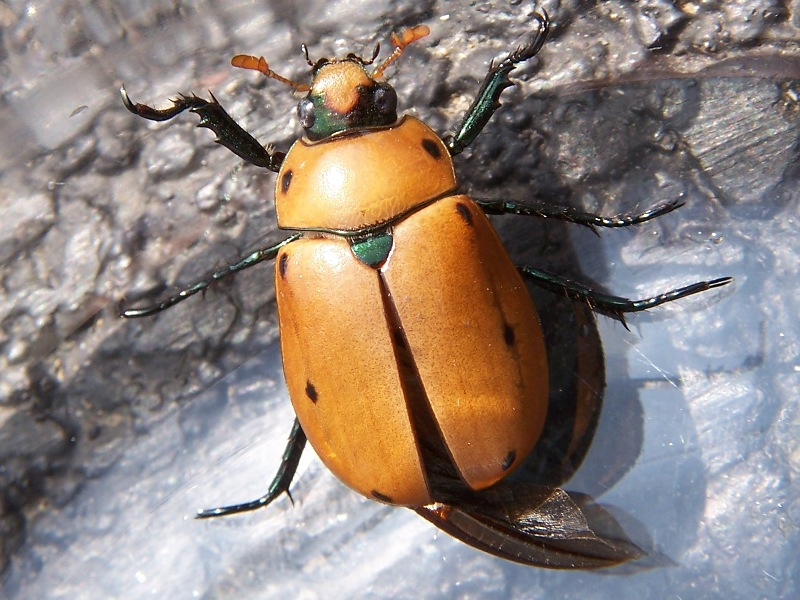

Scientific classification
- Kingdom: Animalia
- Phylum: Arthropoda
- Class: Insecta
- Order: Coleoptera
- Suborder: Polyphaga
- Infraorder: Scarabaeiformia
- Family: Scarabaeidae
- Genus: Pelidnota
- Species: P. punctata

Binomial name
- Pelidnota punctata (Linnaeus, 1758)

Synonyms
- Scarabaeus punctatus Linnaeus, 1758; Melolontha lutea Olivier, 1789; Pelidnota brevicollis Casey, 1915; Pelidnota brevis Casey, 1915; Pelidnota debiliceps Casey, 1915; Pelidnota hudsonica Casey, 1915; Pelidnota oblonga Casey, 1915; Pelidnota pallidipes Casey, 1915; Pelidnota ponderella Casey, 1915; Pelidnota strenua Casey, 1915; Pelidnota tarsalis Casey, 1915; Pelidnota texensis Casey, 1915

= Pelidnota punctata =

Species of beetle

Pelidnota punctata, the grapevine beetle, spotted June beetle or spotted pelidnota, is a species of beetle in the family Scarabaeidae (Scarab beetles), subfamily Rutelinae. Grapevine beetles are common in the north and central United States and eastern Canada, but do relatively little damage to their host plants. The beetles fly at a fast speed, usually in a curving flight.

The adult beetle is approximately 2.5 centimetres (1 inch) long, but can reach 3 cm (1.2 in) occasionally. Its pattern is off-yellow or auburn red, with four black spots running down each side. Fine black lines divide the edges of its elytra. There are regional variants of Pelidnota punctata: a common southern form lacks the darker legs, while the northern form has darker legs. Adults in the northern parts of its range will have darker and more spots, while those in the southern regions may not have them at all. The grapevine beetle is a variable species, whose taxonomy was confused by a single authority (Thomas Casey) who split the species into 11 different taxa in 1915, only to have these names relegated to synonymy by subsequent workers.

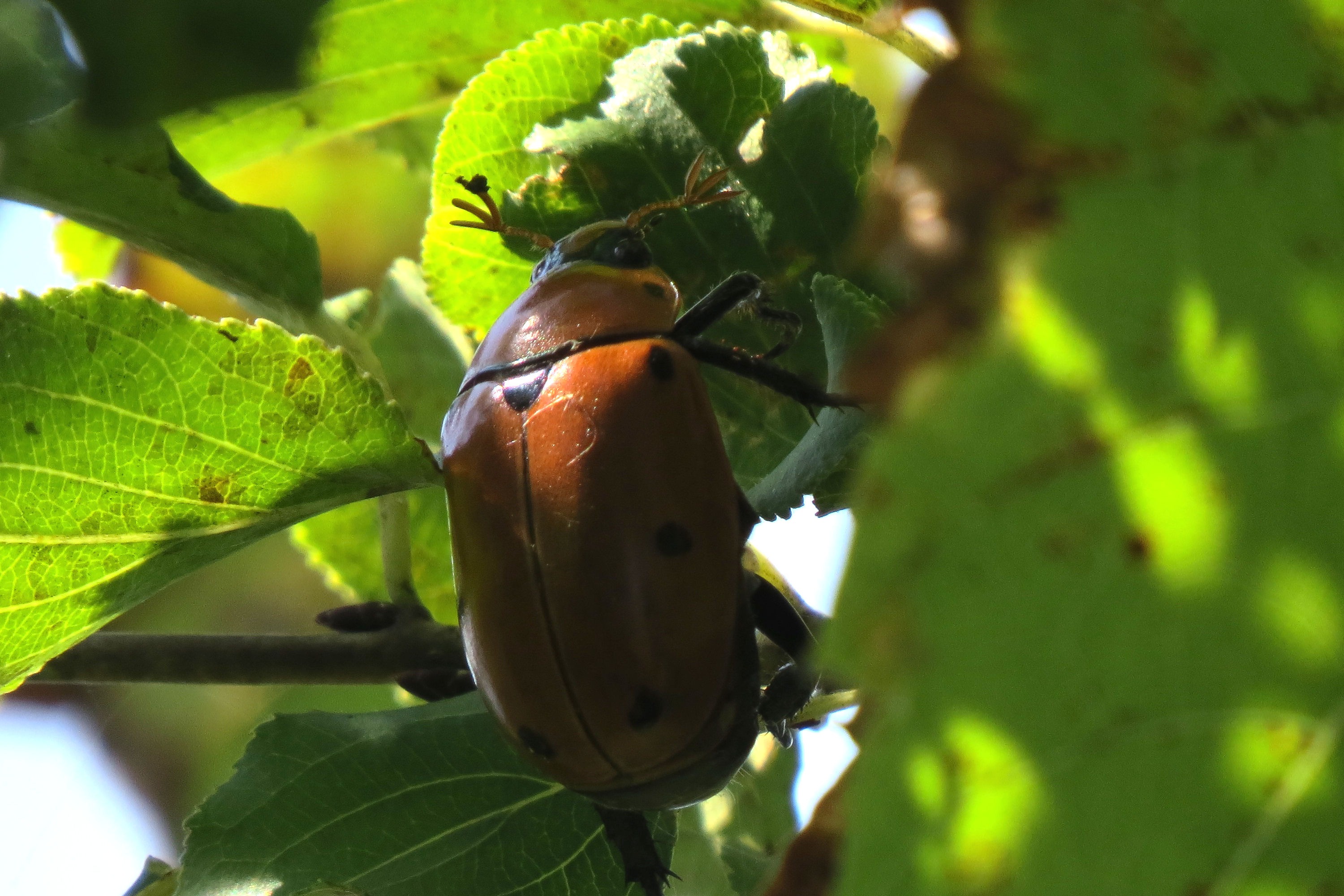

== Habitat and diet ==
This species lives throughout the eastern part of North America, from Ontario and Maine in the north to Florida in the south, and west to Texas and South Dakota. It lives, like many beetles, in forests, thickets, and woods, and is mostly seen during the summer. Active flyers, these beetles are commonly attracted to lights at night. It is also seen in vineyards and gardens.

The adult beetle eats the leaves and fruit of grapevines, both wild and cultivated, although it is not normally a major pest of vineyards.

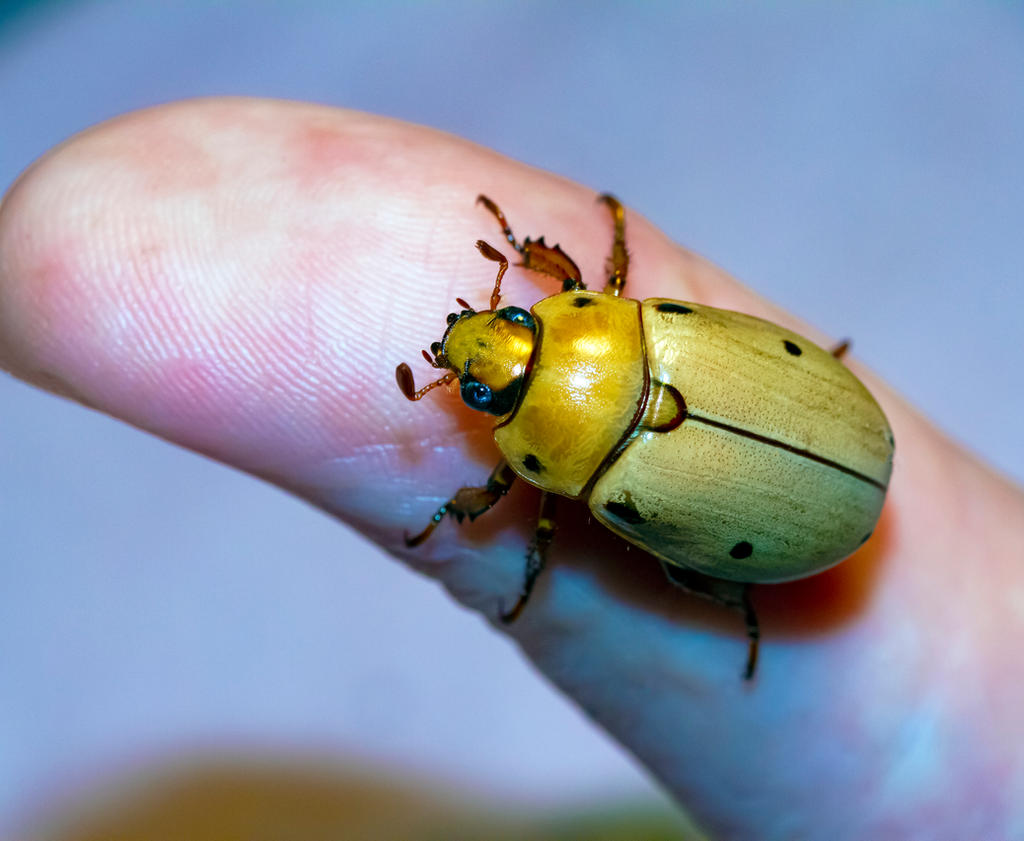
Grapevine Beetle (Pelidnota punctata) on thumb for size comparison

They lay eggs in rotten wood, tree stumps, or on soil near the host plant, where they hatch into larvae, which may grow up to two inches long. Larvae then dig their way into the soil, where they feed on rotted wood. Pupal chambers are built shallowly underground. The adults emerge in July. Its complete life cycle is two years.
