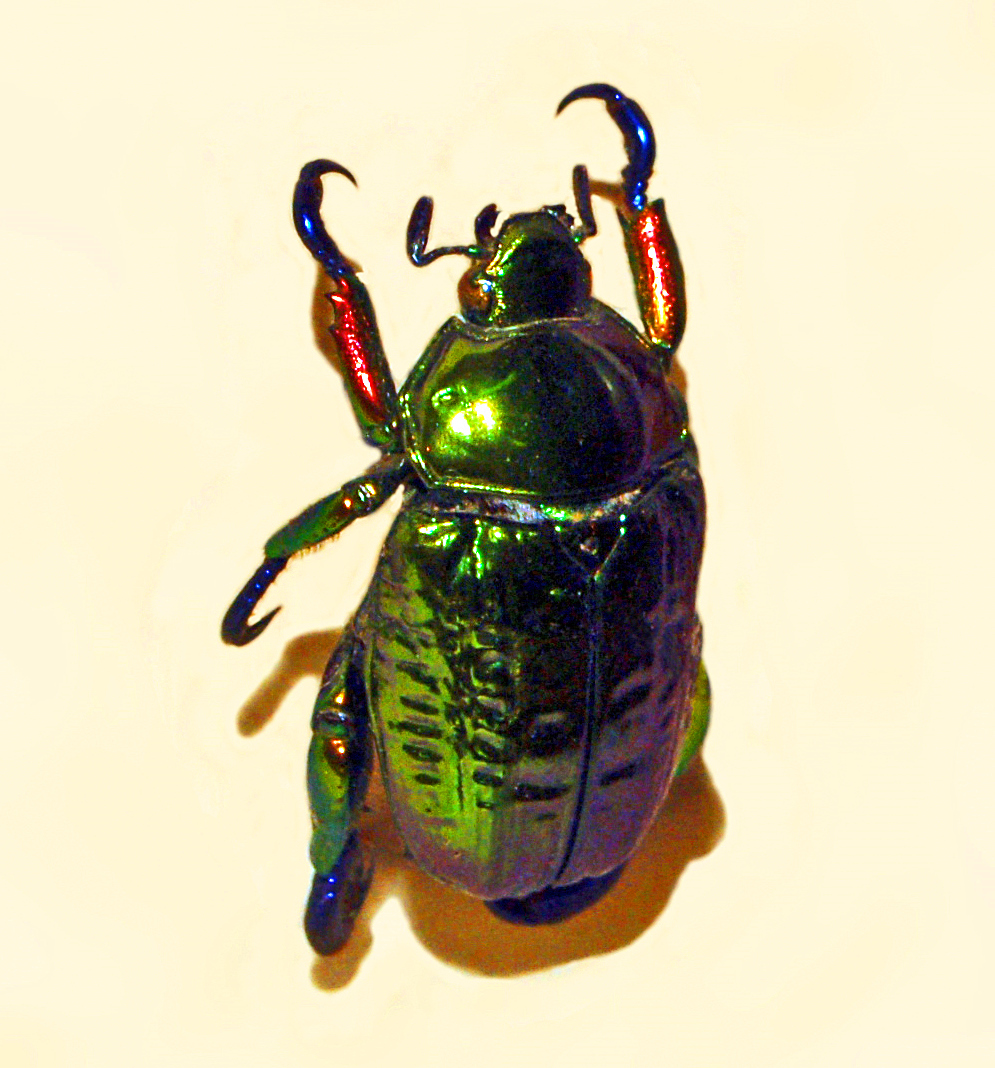
- Pelidnota burmeisteri from Brazil

Scientific classification
- Kingdom: Animalia
- Phylum: Arthropoda
- Class: Insecta
- Order: Coleoptera
- Suborder: Polyphaga
- Infraorder: Scarabaeiformia
- Family: Scarabaeidae
- Genus: Pelidnota
- Species: P. burmeisteri

Binomial name
- Pelidnota burmeisteri Burmeister, 1844

= Pelidnota burmeisteri =

Species of beetle

Pelidnota burmeisteri is a species of beetles of the family Scarabaeidae.

== Description ==
Pelidnota burmeisteri reaches a length of about 26–28 millimetres (1.0–1.1 in).

== Distribution ==
This species occurs in Brazil.
