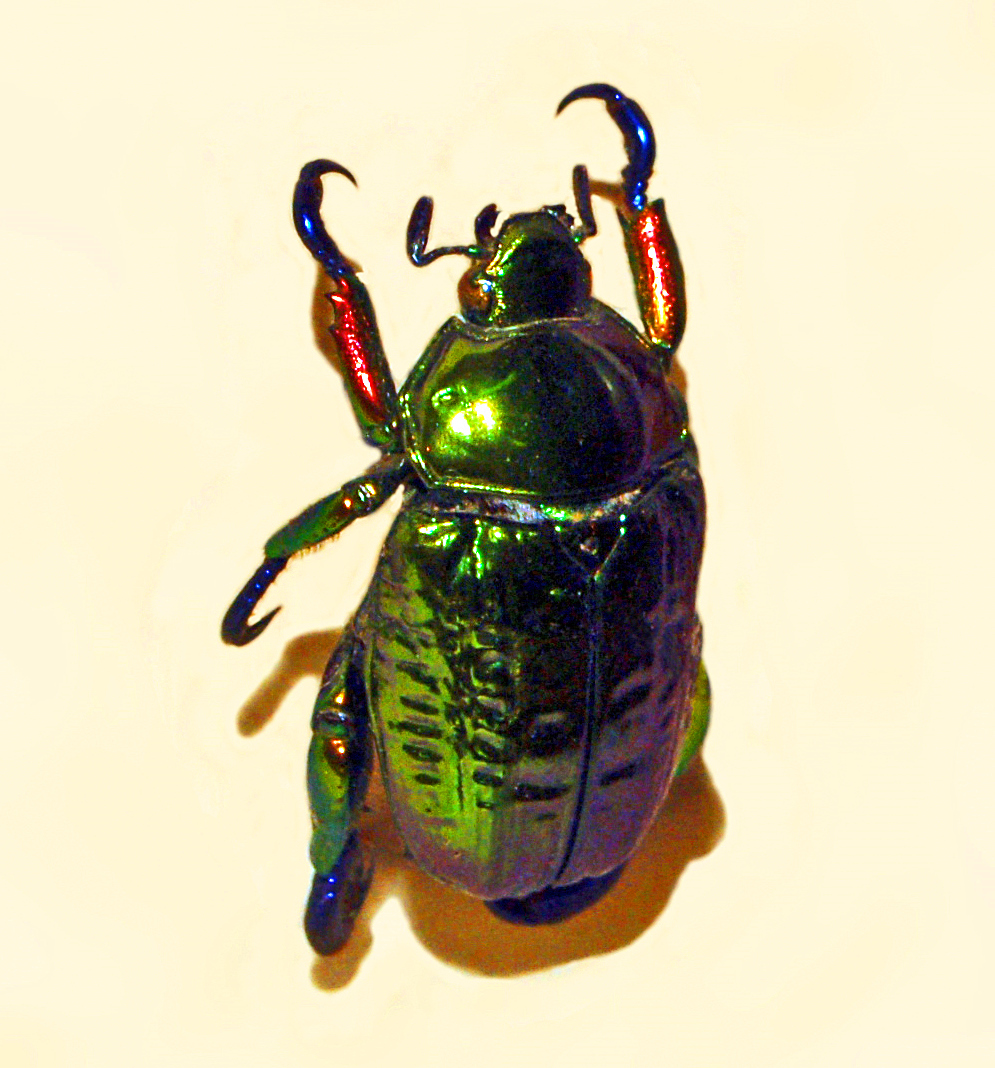
- Pelidnota cyanitarsis from Brazil

Scientific classification
- Kingdom: Animalia
- Phylum: Arthropoda
- Clade: Pancrustacea
- Class: Insecta
- Order: Coleoptera
- Suborder: Polyphaga
- Infraorder: Scarabaeiformia
- Family: Scarabaeidae
- Subfamily: Rutelinae
- Tribe: Rutelini
- Genus: Pelidnota; MacLeay, 1819

Synonyms
- Aglycoptera Sharp, 1885; Chalcoplethis Burmeister, 1844; Delipia Casey, 1915; Delipnia Casey, 1915; Epichalcoplethis Bates, 1904; Gananota Ohaus, 1915; Ganonota Ohaus, 1915; Heteropelidnota Ohaus, 1912; Odontognathus Castelnau, 1840; Orodina Gistel, 1848; Pelidnotidia Casey, 1915; Strigidia Burmeister, 1844

= Pelidnota =

Genus of beetles

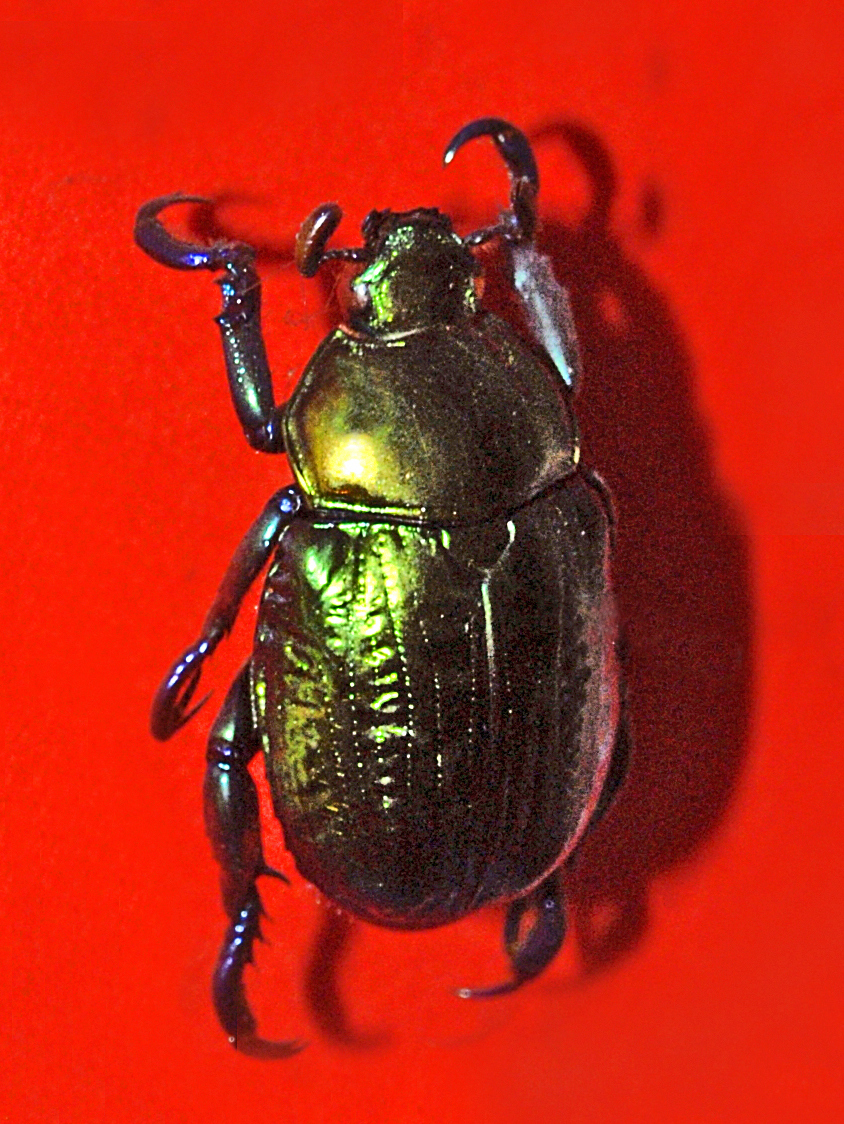
Pelidnota sumptuosa

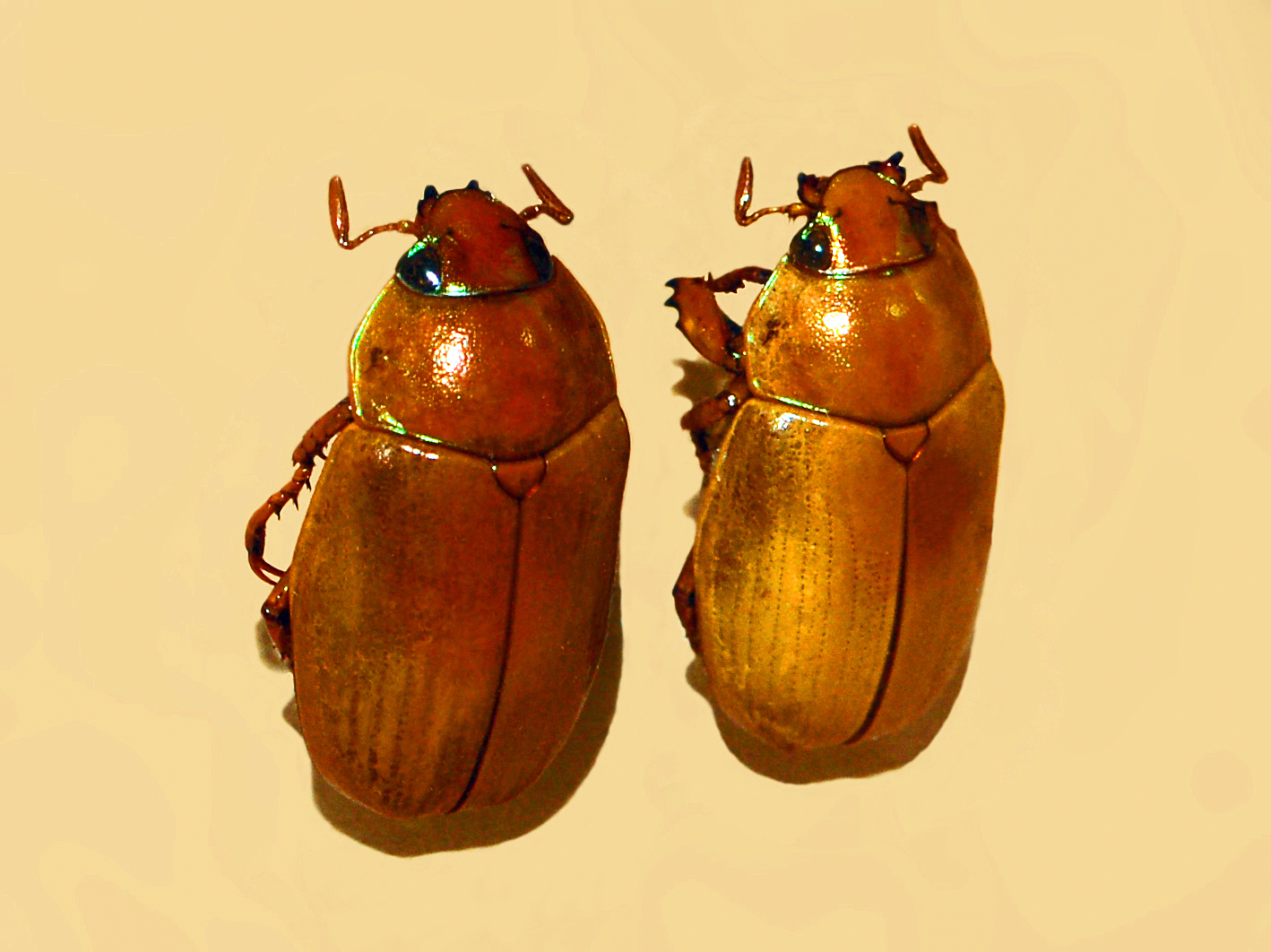
Pelidnota virescens

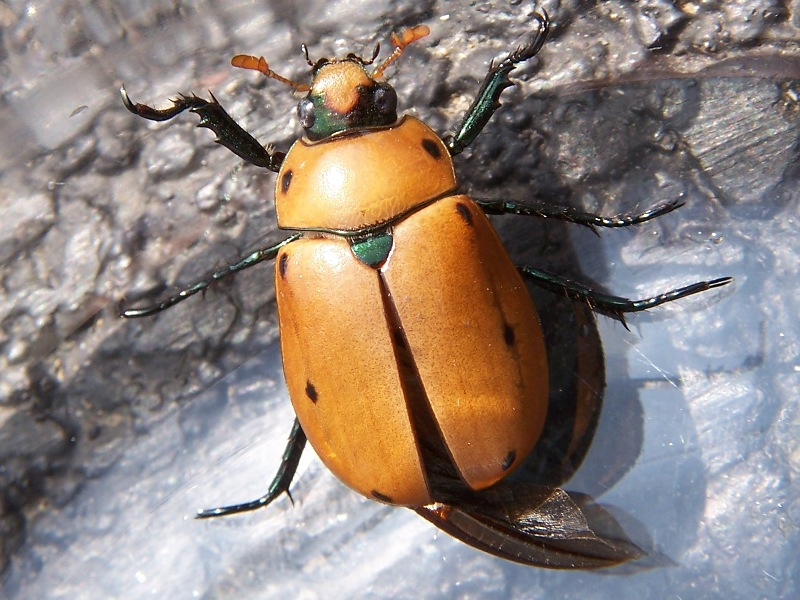
Pelidnota punctata

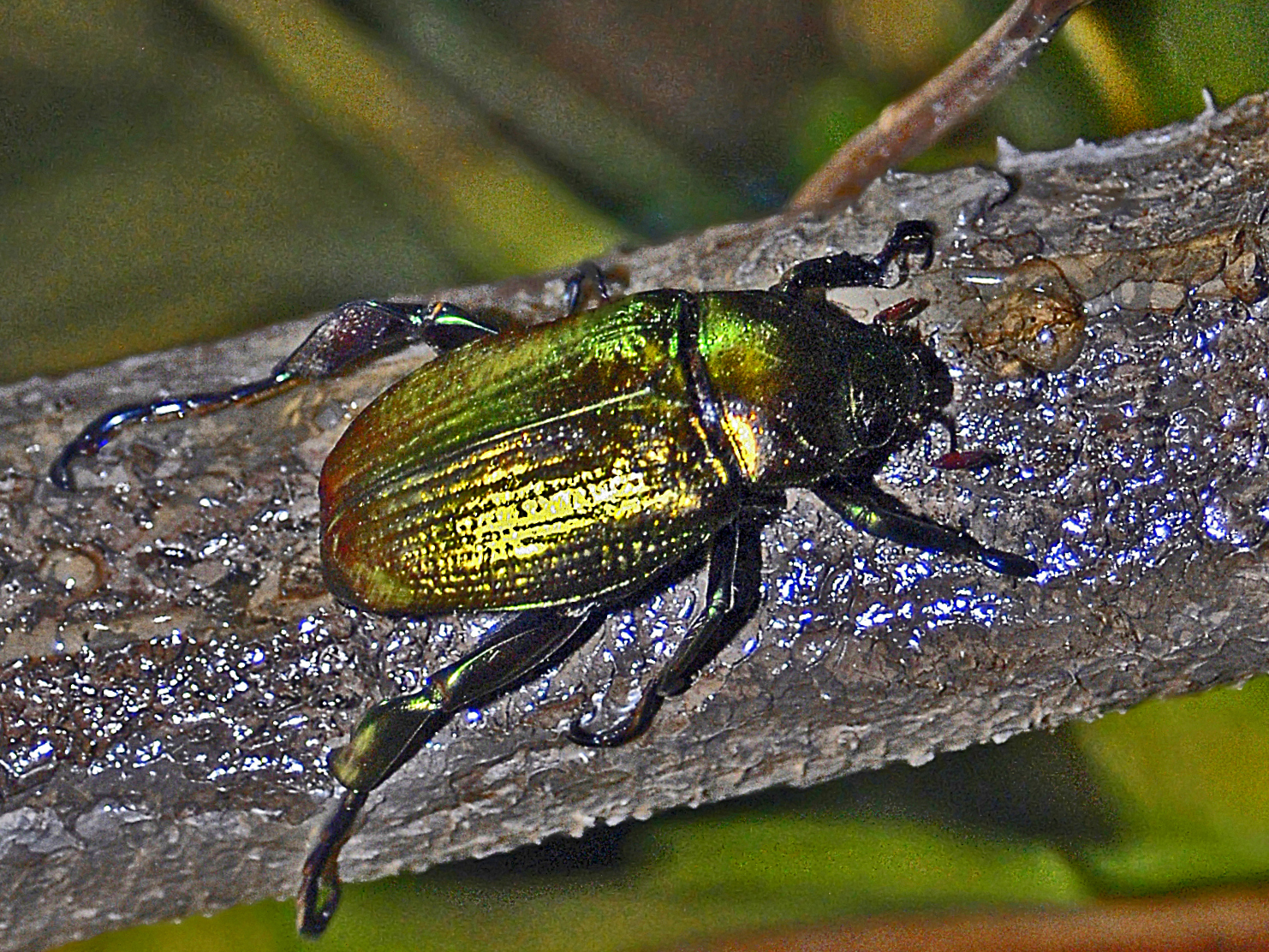
Pelidnota kirbyi

Pelidnota is a genus of beetles of the family Scarabaeidae. There are more than 180 described species in Pelidnota, found in the Neotropics.

== Subgenus and species ==
Species within this genus include the following:

- Pelidnota abracadabra Soula, 2009 (Mexico)
- Pelidnota acconciai Soula, 2009 (Venezuela)
- Pelidnota aeruginosa (Linnaeus, 1767) (Brazil)
- Pelidnota agnesae Soula, 2010 (Brazil)
- Pelidnota alliacea (Germar, 1823) (Brazil, Suriname)
- Pelidnota alutacea Bates, 1888 (Costa Rica, Panama)
- Pelidnota ancilla Bates, 1904 (Brazil)
- Pelidnota angiae Demez & Soula, 2010 (Peru)
- Pelidnota arnaudi Soula, 2009 (Brazil)
- Pelidnota aurescens Bates, 1888 (Guatemala, Honduras, Mexico)
- Pelidnota bahiana Ohaus, 1905
- Pelidnota beckeri Ferreira, Almeida & Bravo, 2017 (Brazil)
- Pelidnota belti Sharp, 1877
- Pelidnota beniouioui Soula, 2010 (Bolivia)
- Pelidnota beraudi Soula, 2009 (Colombia)
- Pelidnota bertrandi Soula, 2009 (Nicaragua)
- Pelidnota bivittata (Swederus, 1787) (Brazil)
- Pelidnota bleuzeni (Bouchard, 2003) (French Guiana, Suriname, Venezuela)
- Pelidnota bondili (Soula, 2006) (Peru)
- Pelidnota boulangeri Soula, 2009 (Venezuela)
- Pelidnota boyi Ohaus, 1928 (Brazil)
- Pelidnota brusteli Soula, 2010 (Peru)
- Pelidnota burmeisteri Burmeister, 1844
- Pelidnota caesarea (Gistel, 1857) (Colombia)
- Pelidnota carlettii Soula, 2009 (Argentina)
- Pelidnota cayennensis Bates, 1904 (French Guiana, Guyana, Venezuela)
- Pelidnota centroamericana Ohaus, 1913 (Belize, Guatemala, Honduras, Mexico)
- Pelidnota cerdai (Soula, 2006) (French Guiana, Suriname)
- Pelidnota chalcopus Bates, 1888 (Belize, Guatemala, Honduras)
- Pelidnota chalcothorax Perty, 1830
- Pelidnota championi Bates, 1904 (Argentina)
- Pelidnota chiapasensis Soula, 2009 (Mexico)
- Pelidnota chibchana Ohaus, 1922 (Colombia)
- Pelidnota chimborazoensis Soula, 2009 (Ecuador)
- Pelidnota chiriquicola Ohaus, 1913 (Costa Rica, Panama)
- Pelidnota chiriquina Bates, 1904 (Colombia, Costa Rica, Panama)
- Pelidnota chlorana Erichson, 1847 (Bolivia, Brazil, Ecuador)
- Pelidnota costaricensis Bates, 1888 (Costa Rica, Panama)
- Pelidnota courtini Soula, 2009 (Brazil)
- Pelidnota crassipes Ohaus, 1905 (Argentina, Bolivia, Brazil, Paraguay)
- Pelidnota cribrata (Ohaus, 1913) (Brazil, Colombia, French Guiana)
- Pelidnota cuprea (Germar, 1823) (Argentina, Bolivia, Brazil, Paraguay)
- Pelidnota cupripes Perty, 1830
- Pelidnota cyanipes (Kirby, 1818) (Argentina, Brazil)
- Pelidnota cyanitarsis (Gory, 1833) (Brazil)
- Pelidnota degallieri Soula, 2010 (Venezuela)
- Pelidnota dieteri Soula, 2011 (Brazil)
- Pelidnota discicollis Ohaus, 1912 (Brazil, Venezuela)
- Pelidnota dobleri Frey, 1967 (Bolivia, Brazil, Peru)
- Pelidnota drumonti Soula, 2009 (Brazil)
- Pelidnota dubia Bates, 1904 (Colombia)
- Pelidnota durantonorum Soula, 2009 (French Guiana, Suriname)
- Pelidnota ebenina (Blanchard, 1847) (Argentina, Bolivia)
- Pelidnota egana Ohaus, 1912 (Brazil)
- Pelidnota emerita (Olivier, 1789) (Central America)
- Pelidnota equatoriana Soula, 2009 (Ecuador)
- Pelidnota estebanabadiei Soula, 2009 (Brazil)
- Pelidnota estebandurani (Soula, 2006)
- Pelidnota everardoi Ferreira & Grossi, 2022 (Brazil)
- Pelidnota fabricelavalettei Soula, 2009 (French Guiana)
- Pelidnota fallax (Gistel, 1857) (Brazil)
- Pelidnota filippiniae Soula, 2009 (Brazil)
- Pelidnota flavovittata (Perty, 1830) (Brazil)
- Pelidnota fracida Bates, 1904 (Brazil)
- Pelidnota frommeri Hardy, 1975 (Neotropical)
- Pelidnota fulva Blanchard, 1851 (Bolivia, Brazil)
- Pelidnota fusciventris Ohaus, 1905
- Pelidnota fuscoviridis Ohaus, 1913 (Venezuela)
- Pelidnota gabrielae Martinez, 1979 (Venezuela)
- Pelidnota genieri (Soula, 2006) (Venezuela)
- Pelidnota gilletti Soula, 2009 (Mexico)
- Pelidnota girardi (Bouchard, 2003) (French Guiana, Guyana, Suriname)
- Pelidnota glaberrima Blanchard, 1851
- Pelidnota glabra Ohaus, 1922
- Pelidnota gounellei (Ohaus, 1908) (Brazil)
- Pelidnota gracilis (Gory, 1834)
- Pelidnota grangesi (Soula, 2006) (Bolivia)
- Pelidnota granulata (Gory, 1834) (Neotropical)
- Pelidnota grossiorum Soula, 2009 (Brazil)
- Pelidnota guatemalensis Bates, 1888 (Neotropical)
- Pelidnota gwendolinae (Soula, 2006) (Bolivia)
- Pelidnota halleri Demez & Soula, 2011 (Peru)
- Pelidnota herbacea Blanchard, 1851 (Bolivia)
- Pelidnota hernanlequericai (Soula, 2006) (Peru)
- Pelidnota hirsutiphallica Ratcliffe & Jameson, 1989 (Costa Rica, Panama)
- Pelidnota hoefigi Ohaus, 1912 (French Guiana, Peru)
- Pelidnota huetheri Howden, 1998 (Panama)
- Pelidnota impressicollis Ohaus, 1925 (Brazil)
- Pelidnota incerta (Soula, 2006) (Peru)
- Pelidnota injantepalominoi Demez & Soula, 2011 (Peru)
- Pelidnota instabilis Ohaus, 1912 (Brazil)
- Pelidnota jalapensis Bates, 1888 (Mexico)
- Pelidnota jolyi Martinez, 1982 (Brazil, Venezuela)
- Pelidnota kirschi Bates, 1904
- Pelidnota kucerai Soula, 2009 (Colombia)
- Pelidnota kuhnti (Ohaus, 1912) (Paraguay)
- Pelidnota labyrinthophallica Solis & Morón, 1994 (Costa Rica)
- Pelidnota lacazei Soula, 2010 (Peru)
- Pelidnota laevissima Burmeister, 1855 (Neotropical)
- Pelidnota lagoi Soula, 2011 (Brazil)
- Pelidnota langsdorffi (Mannerheim, 1828) (Brazil, French Guiana)
- Pelidnota liturella (Kirby, 1818)
- Pelidnota louzadai (Soula, 2006) (Brazil)
- Pelidnota lucae LeConte, 1863 (Mexico)
- Pelidnota luciae Ferreira & Grossi, 2022 (Brazil)
- Pelidnota lucida Burmeister, 1844 (Colombia, Trinidad & Tobago, Venezuela)
- Pelidnota ludovici Ohaus, 1905 (Brazil)
- Pelidnota lugubris LeConte, 1874 (Mexico, Arizona, New Mexico)
- Pelidnota luridipes Blanchard, 1851 (Brazil)
- Pelidnota malyi Soula, 2010 (Ecuador)
- Pelidnota mantillerii Soula, 2009 (Brazil)
- Pelidnota matogrossensis Frey, 1976 (Bolivia, Brazil)
- Pelidnota mezai Soula, 2009 (Peru)
- Pelidnota micobalaguerae (Soula, 2006)
- Pelidnota neitamorenoi (Soula, 2006)
- Pelidnota nitescens (Vigors, 1825) (Brazil)
- Pelidnota nordestina Ferreira, Almeida & Bravo, 2017 (Brazil)
- Pelidnota notata Blanchard, 1851 (Neotropics)
- Pelidnota ohausi Frey, 1976
- Pelidnota osculatii Guérin-Méneville, 1855 (Colombia, Ecuador, Venezuela)
- Pelidnota pallidipennis Bates, 1904 (Brazil)
- Pelidnota paraguayensis Bates, 1904 (Paraguay)
- Pelidnota parallela Hardy, 1975 (Colombia, Costa Rica, Panama)
- Pelidnota parvasedmagnifica (Soula & Moragues, 2006) (French Guiana, Suriname)
- Pelidnota pennata Ohaus, 1912 (Brazil, Nicaragua, Panama)
- Pelidnota pernambucana Ferreira, Almeida & Bravo, 2017 (Brazil)
- Pelidnota perplexa Hardy, 1975 (Mexico)
- Pelidnota peslieri Soula, 2009 (Peru)
- Pelidnota polita (Latreille, 1812)
- Pelidnota porioni Soula, 2010 (Peru)
- Pelidnota prasina Burmeister, 1844 (Brazil, Colombia, Ecuador, Venezuela)
- Pelidnota prolixa Sharp, 1877 (Colombia, Costa Rica, Ecuador, Nicaragua, Panama)
- Pelidnota pubes Ohaus, 1913 (Ecuador)
- Pelidnota pulchella (Kirby, 1818)
- Pelidnota punctata (Linnaeus, 1758) (Grapevine Beetle) (Nearctic)
- Pelidnota punctulata Bates, 1888
- Pelidnota purpurea Burmeister, 1844
- Pelidnota quadripunctata Bates, 1904 (French Guiana, Suriname)
- Pelidnota raingeardi Soula, 2009 (Ecuador)
- Pelidnota recondita Delgado, Deloya & Morón, 1988 (Mexico)
- Pelidnota rioensis Soula, 2009 (Brazil)
- Pelidnota rivascanteroi (Soula, 2006) (Brazil)
- Pelidnota rostrata Burmeister, 1844 (Brazil)
- Pelidnota rouchei (Soula, 2006) (Venezuela)
- Pelidnota rubripennis (Burmeister, 1844)
- Pelidnota rubriventris Blanchard, 1851 (Colombia, Panama)
- Pelidnota rugulosa Burmeister, 1844
- Pelidnota runica (Gistel, 1850) (French Guiana)
- Pelidnota sanctidomini Ohaus, 1905
- Pelidnota satipoensis Demez & Soula, 2010 (Peru)
- Pelidnota schneideri Soula, 2010 (Peru)
- Pelidnota semiaurata Burmeister, 1844
- Pelidnota sericeicollis Frey, 1976 (Brazil)
- Pelidnota sikorskii (Soula, 2006) (Brazil)
- Pelidnota silveiranetoi Ferreira, Vaz-de-Mello & Bravo, 2021 (Brazil)
- Pelidnota simoensi Soula, 2009 (Bolivia)
- Pelidnota soederstroemi Ohaus, 1908 (Ecuador)
- Pelidnota sordida (Germar, 1823) (Neotropical)
- Pelidnota striatopunctata (Kirsch, 1885) (Bolivia)
- Pelidnota strigosa Laporte, 1840 (Neotropical)
- Pelidnota subandina Ohaus, 1905
- Pelidnota sumptuosa (Vigors, 1825) (Neotropical)
- Pelidnota teocuitlamayatli Delgado, Deloya & Morón, 1988 (Mexico)
- Pelidnota testaceovirens Blanchard, 1851
- Pelidnota texensis Casey, 1915 (Oklahoma, Texas)
- Pelidnota thiliezi Soula, 2009 (Brazil)
- Pelidnota tibialis Burmeister, 1844
- Pelidnota toulgoeti (Soula, 2006) (Peru)
- Pelidnota touroulti Soula, 2008 (French Guiana, Suriname)
- Pelidnota tristis (Gistel, 1850) (Brazil)
- Pelidnota ulianai Soula, 2010 (Bolivia)
- Pelidnota uncinata Ohaus, 1930 (Bolivia, Brazil, Ecuador, Peru)
- Pelidnota unicolor (Drury, 1782)
- Pelidnota ustarani (Martinez, 1967) (Brazil)
- Pelidnota vanderberghi Soula, 2010 (Bolivia)
- Pelidnota vazdemelloi (Soula, 2006) (Brazil)
- Pelidnota versicolor (Billberg, 1820) (Brazil)
- Pelidnota villavicencioensis Soula, 2010 (Colombia)
- Pelidnota virescens Burmeister, 1844 (Neotropical)
- Pelidnota viridicuprea Ohaus, 1908 (Ecuador)
- Pelidnota vitalisi Ohaus, 1925 (Brazil)
- Pelidnota vitticollis Burmeister, 1844 (Brazil)
- Pelidnota vladimalyi Moore & Jameson, 2013 (Ecuador)
- Pelidnota werneri (Soula, 2006) (Peru)
- Pelidnota xanthopyga Hardy, 1975 (Colombia, Honduras, Panama)
- Pelidnota xanthospila (Germar, 1823) (Brazil)
- Pelidnota yungasensis Soula, 2009 (Bolivia)
- Pelidnota zovii Soula, 2010 (Peru)
