= Pelidnota lugubris =

Scientific classification
- Kingdom: Animalia
- Phylum: Arthropoda
- Class: Insecta
- Order: Coleoptera
- Suborder: Polyphaga
- Infraorder: Scarabaeiformia
- Family: Scarabaeidae
- Genus: Pelidnota
- Species: P. lugubris

Binomial name
- Pelidnota lugubris LeConte, 1874

Species of beetle

Pelidnota lugubris is a species of shining leaf chafer in the family of beetles known as Scarabaeidae.
