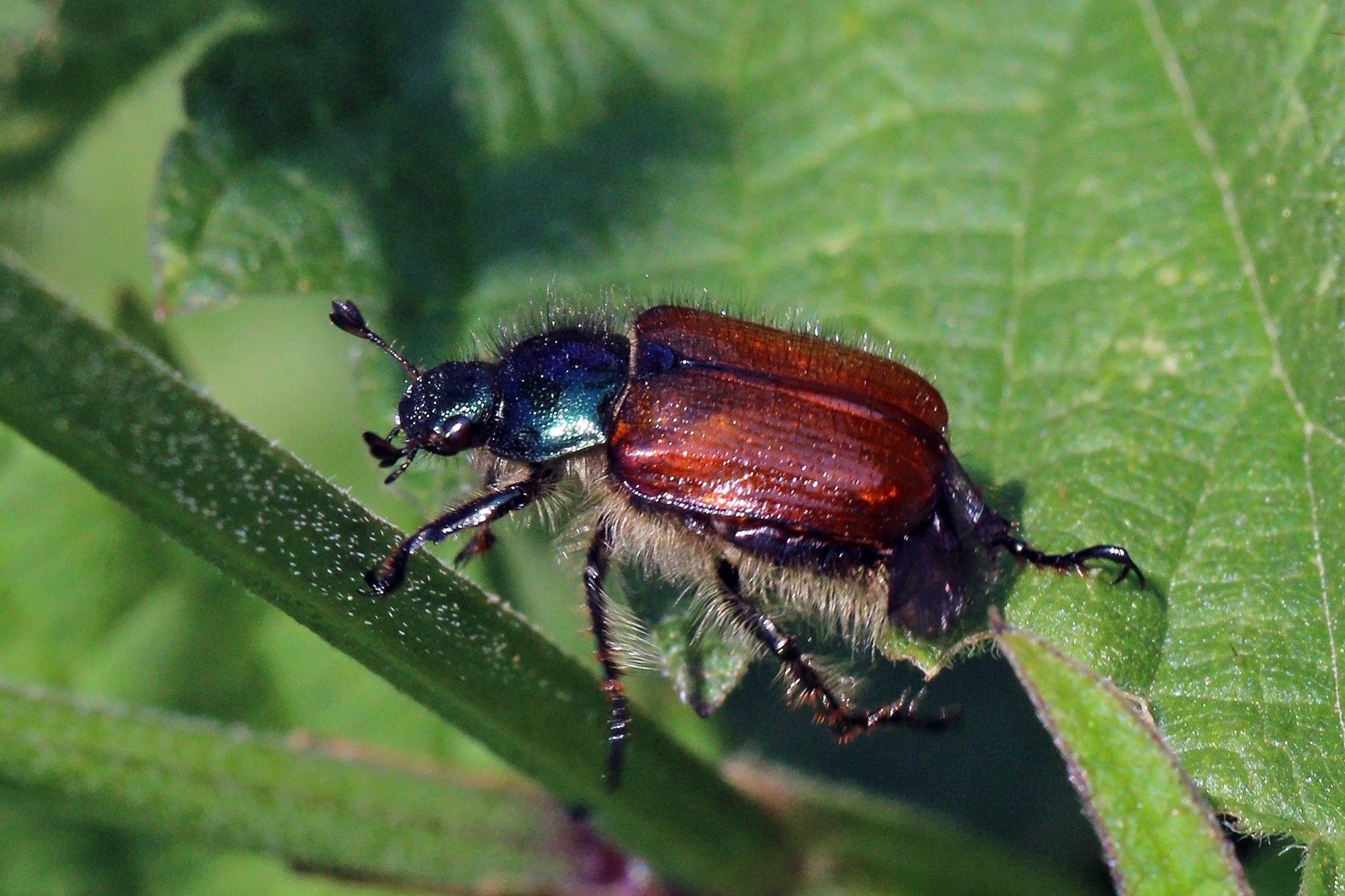
- In Oxfordshire, England
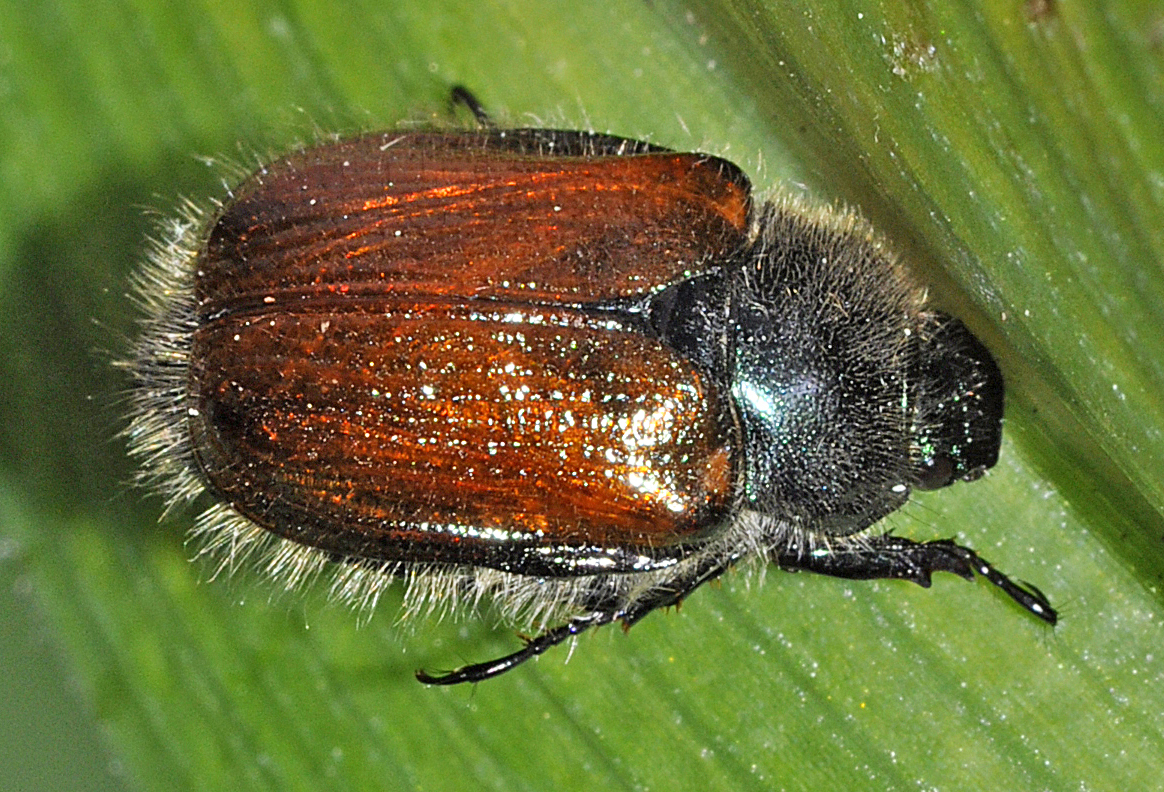
- Dorsal view

Scientific classification
- Kingdom: Animalia
- Phylum: Arthropoda
- Clade: Pancrustacea
- Class: Insecta
- Order: Coleoptera
- Suborder: Polyphaga
- Infraorder: Scarabaeiformia
- Family: Scarabaeidae
- Genus: Phyllopertha
- Species: P. horticola

Binomial name
- Phyllopertha horticola (Linnaeus, 1758)

Synonyms
- Scarabaeus horticola Linnaeus, 1758; Anomala horticola

= Phyllopertha horticola =

Garden chafer

Species of beetle

Phyllopertha horticola, the garden chafer or garden foliage beetle, is a beetle from the family Scarabaeidae. Phyllopertha horticola was described by Carl Linnaeus in his landmark 1758 10th edition of Systema Naturae.

== Variety ==
- Phyllopertha horticola var. ustulatipennis A. Villa & G. B. Villa, 1833

== Distribution ==
This rather common species is widely widespread in Europe and in Asia, east to Siberia and Mongolia. In the north of Europe their distribution reaches the middle Fennoscandia and includes the British Isles, in southern Europe it mainly occurs in the mountains. It is the only European representative of the genus Phyllopertha.

== Habitat ==
These beetles inhabit bushes, hedgerows, woodland edges, meadows and fields, from the lowlands to mountainous areas. They also live in parks and gardens, hence the common name of garden chafer.

== Description ==
Phyllopertha horticola is approximately 8.5–11 millimetres (0.33–0.43 in) in size. Unlike Mimela of the same family, these beetles have a non-ovoid body. They have chestnut-brown wing casings which are covered with a long upright pubescence. On each elytron run six longitudinal bands of small dots. Head and thorax are finely granulated. Head, thorax and legs are shiny dark green or bluish. The underside of the body is also green. The antennas are very short and end in a fan-like group of three lamellae, with which the beetle perceives fragrances.

== Biology ==
The adult beetle can be seen from April to July, especially in late spring and early summer. In June they can be encountered in particularly large numbers. Adults live for up to eight weeks.

Females lay 15-25 eggs in the ground at a depth of 10–15 cm. After a period of 4–6 weeks they hatch and larvae grow up to 2 cm in length and develop in the soil. Larvae take 2–3 years to develop. They overwinter in the ground. In April, they migrate to deeper soil layers to turn into a chrysalis and hatch in May into an imago, allowing an adult insect to emerge. The males swarm first; the females follow with a few days delay. The females are mated very quickly by flying around males.

Larvae and beetles are considered an agricultural pest. Beetles damage leaves, flowers and developing fruits of many deciduous trees and shrubs (mainly oak leaves, hazelnut and birch leaves, as well as cherry and rose petals). Larval stages will feed on roots of clover, grasses and crops (cereals, cabbages, cucumbers, beets, peas).

== Gallery ==
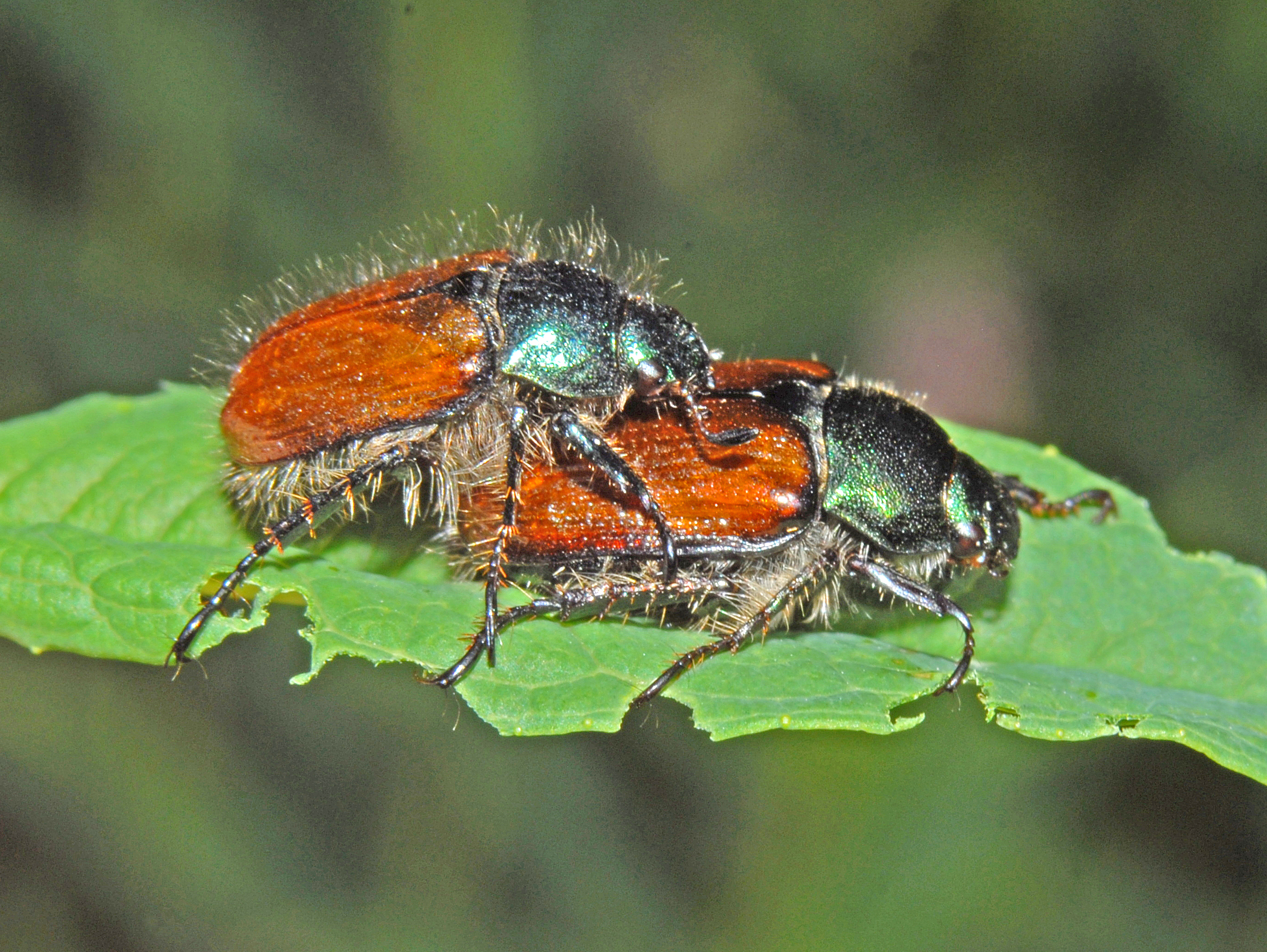
Mating couple

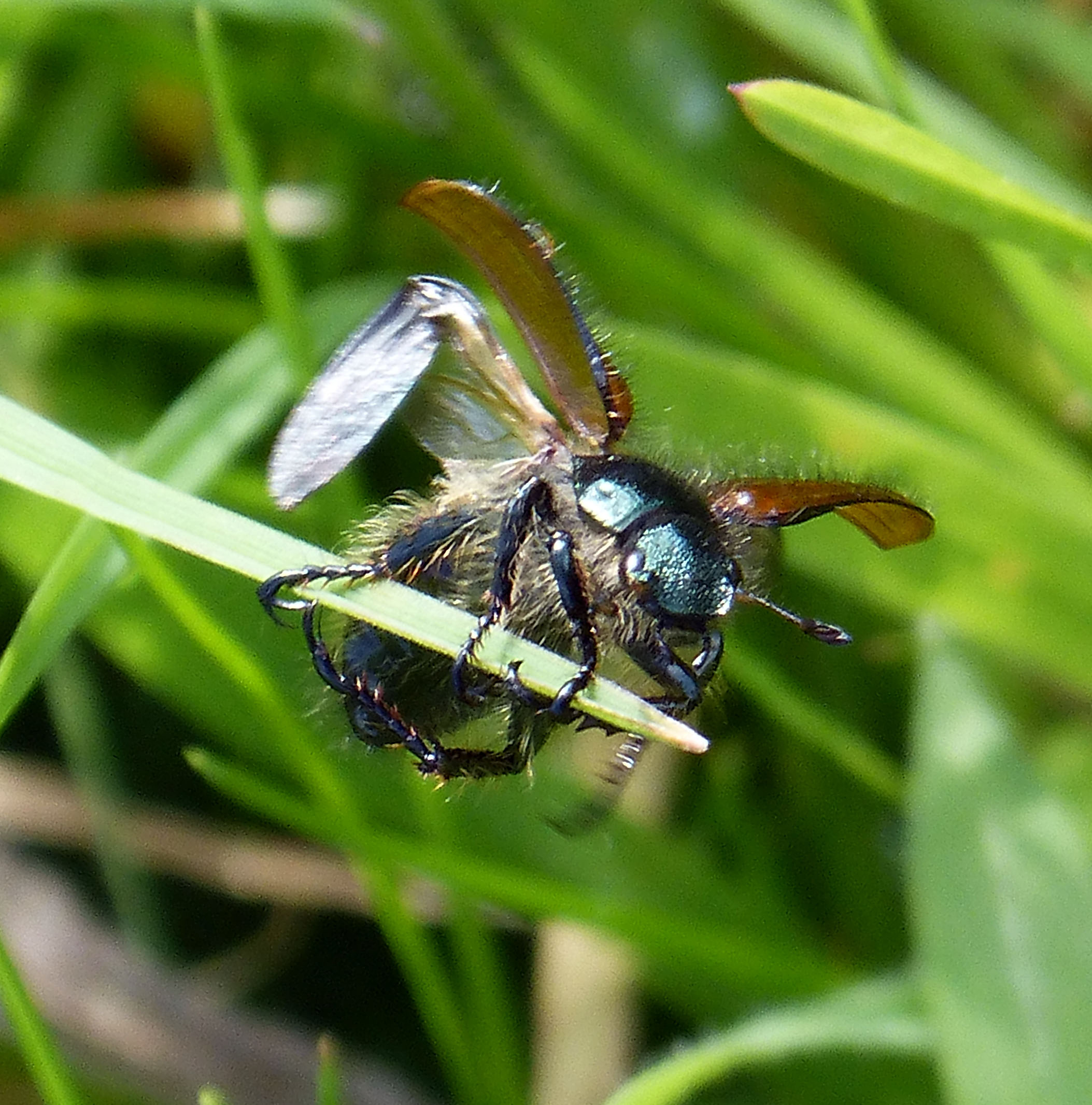
Take off

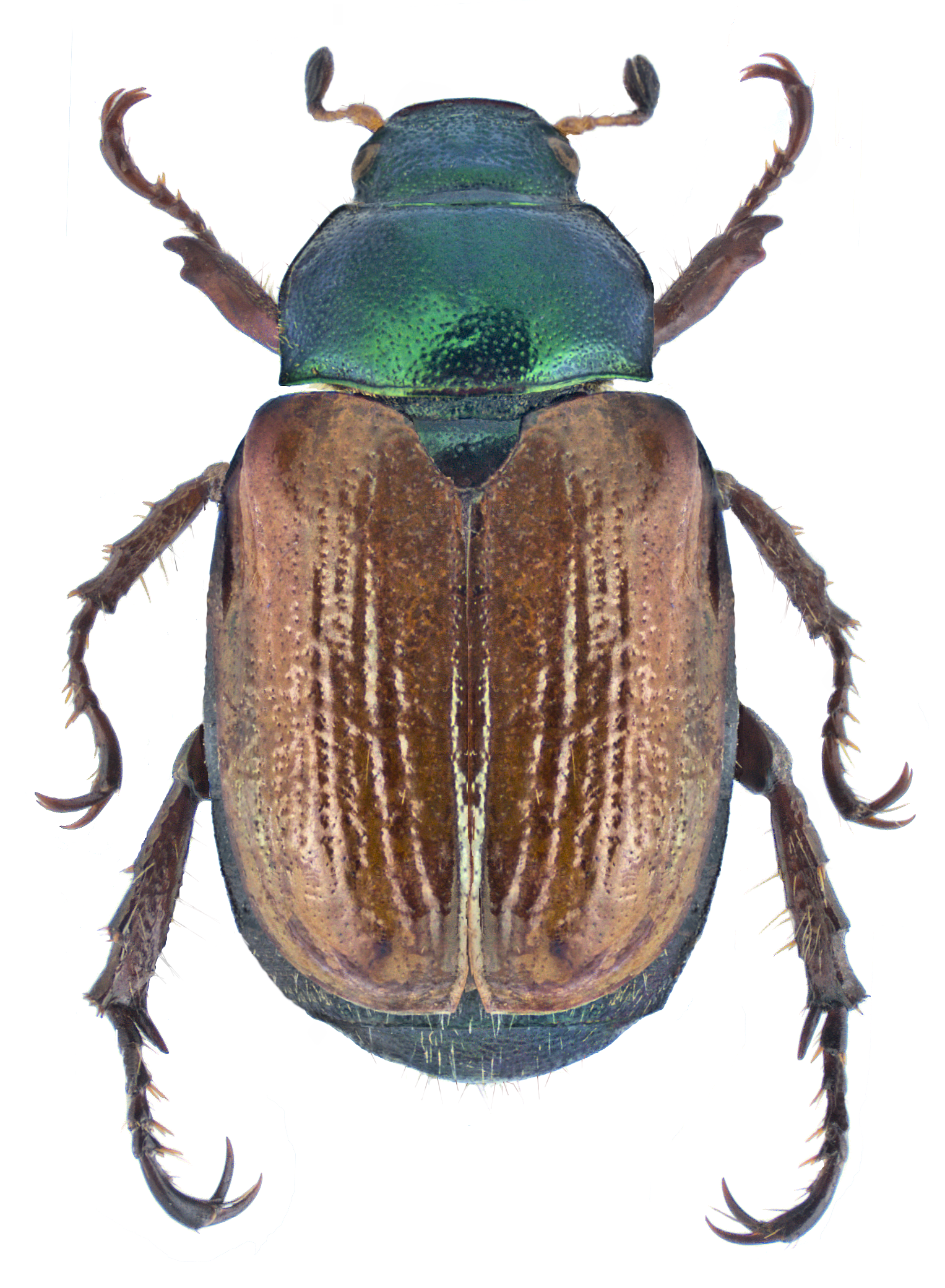
Mounted specimen

Video clip

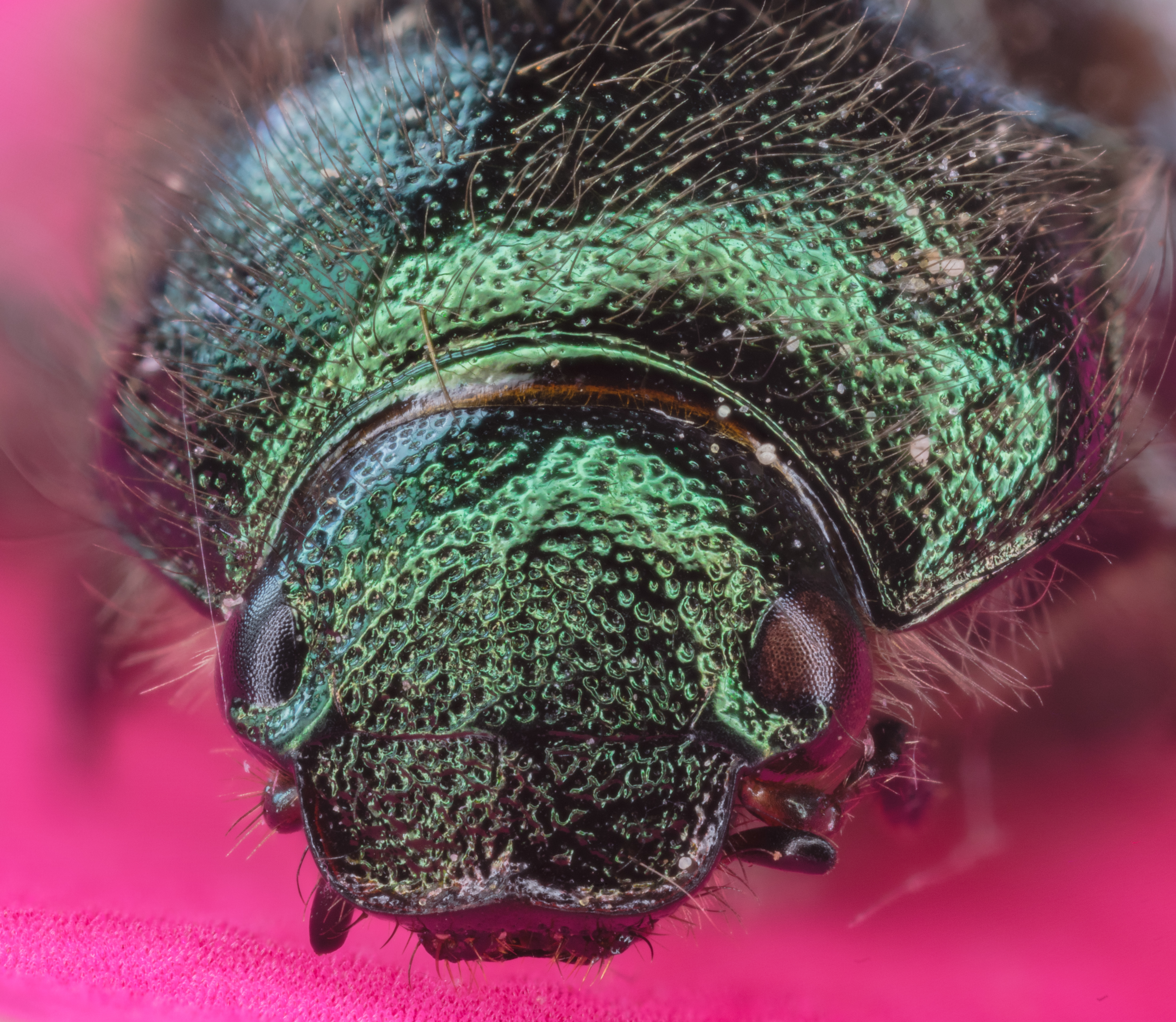
Detail of the head
