= Mimela unicolor =

Scientific classification
- Kingdom: Animalia
- Phylum: Arthropoda
- Clade: Pancrustacea
- Class: Insecta
- Order: Coleoptera
- Suborder: Polyphaga
- Infraorder: Scarabaeiformia
- Family: Scarabaeidae
- Genus: Mimela
- Species: M. unicolor

Binomial name
- Mimela unicolor Frey, 1975

Species of beetle

Mimela unicolor is a species of beetle of the family Scarabaeidae. It is found in Indonesia (Sumatra).

== Description ==
Adults reach a length of about 9-11 mm. The upper and lower surfaces are yellowish-brown with a green sheen. The elytra has a broad, pale yellow margin. The upper surface is glabrous, while the underside of the thorax has longer pubescence. The pronotum is densely, and slightly more coarsely punctate than the head. The antennae are brown.
