= Mimela macleayana =

Scientific classification
- Kingdom: Animalia
- Phylum: Arthropoda
- Clade: Pancrustacea
- Class: Insecta
- Order: Coleoptera
- Suborder: Polyphaga
- Infraorder: Scarabaeiformia
- Family: Scarabaeidae
- Genus: Mimela
- Species: M. macleayana

Binomial name
- Mimela macleayana (Vigors, 1825)

Synonyms
- Euchlora macleayana Vigors, 1825; Mimela macleayana Arrow, 1910

Species of beetle

Mimela macleayana, is a species of true dung beetle found in India and Sri Lanka.
