= Mimela langbianica =

Scientific classification
- Kingdom: Animalia
- Phylum: Arthropoda
- Clade: Pancrustacea
- Class: Insecta
- Order: Coleoptera
- Suborder: Polyphaga
- Infraorder: Scarabaeiformia
- Family: Scarabaeidae
- Genus: Mimela
- Species: M. langbianica

Binomial name
- Mimela langbianica Prokofiev & Zorn, 2016

Species of scarab beetle

Mimela langbianica is a species of scarab beetle in the family Scarabaeidae.

== Description ==
They are leaf-green colored, and have a trapezoidal clypeus. Their elytra makes them similar to Anomala felicia.

== Range ==
They had been known to live in the Đà Lạt Plateau.
