= Mimela inoei =

Scientific classification
- Kingdom: Animalia
- Phylum: Arthropoda
- Clade: Pancrustacea
- Class: Insecta
- Order: Coleoptera
- Suborder: Polyphaga
- Infraorder: Scarabaeiformia
- Family: Scarabaeidae
- Genus: Mimela
- Species: M. inoei

Binomial name
- Mimela inoei Nomura, 1967

Species of beetle

Mimela inoei is a species of beetle of the family Scarabaeidae. It is found in Japan (Honshu).

== Description ==
Adults reach a length of about 12.5-17 mm. They are very similar to Mimela flavilabris, but the frons lacks the hair or bristle near eyes, the median longitudinal groove of the pronotum is generally deeper and the punctures on the elytra are a little larger and the striae are deeper and alternate intervals more convex. Furthermore, the male genitalia are quite different..
