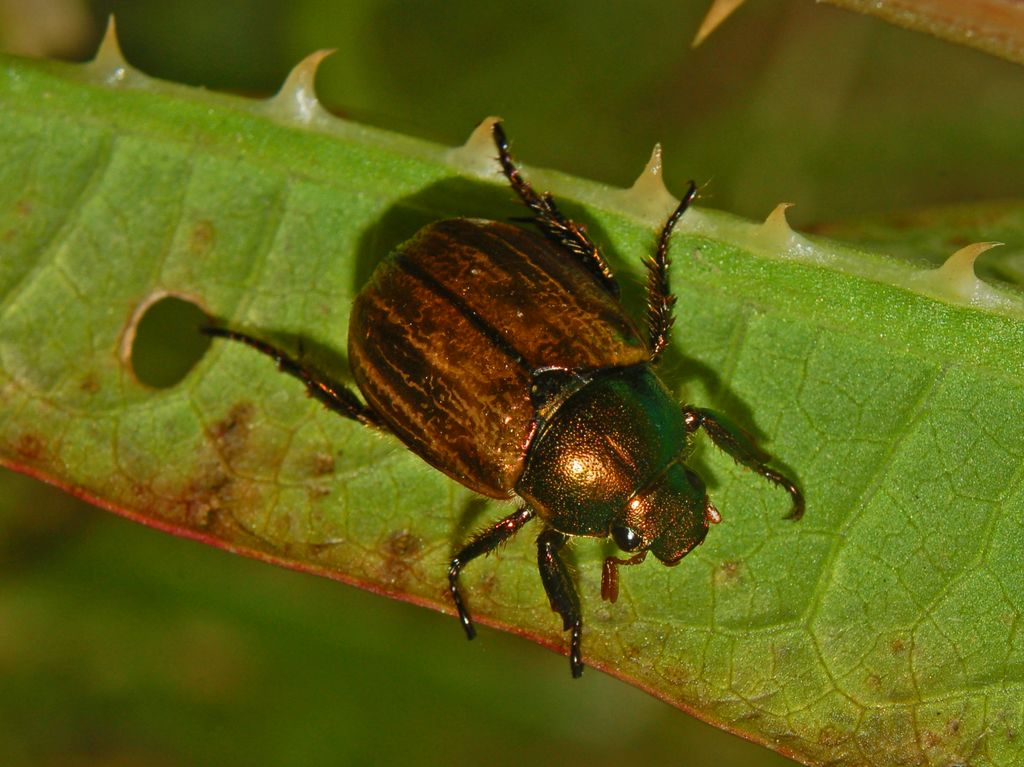

Scientific classification
- Kingdom: Animalia
- Phylum: Arthropoda
- Clade: Pancrustacea
- Class: Insecta
- Order: Coleoptera
- Suborder: Polyphaga
- Infraorder: Scarabaeiformia
- Family: Scarabaeidae
- Genus: Mimela
- Species: M. junii

Binomial name
- Mimela junii (Duftschmid, 1805)

Synonyms
- Amblomala juni; Anomala juni Poda, 1761; Anomala junii Duftschmid, 1805

= Mimela junii =

Species of beetle

Mimela junii is a species of shining leaf chafer belonging to the family Scarabaeidae subfamily Rutelinae.

These scarabs are mainly present in Austria, France, Italy and Switzerland.

The head, pronotum and the inner margin of elytra are metallic-green, antennae are reddish, while elytra are coppery-brown, with longitudinal darker stripes.

The adults can be encountered from June (hence the Latin word junii) through July on flowers, especially on elder flowers (Sambucus species).

The adults beetles mainly feed on leaves of various wild shrubs and grasses, while larvae prefer sandy soils and are rhizophagous, feeding on roots at the expense of psammophilous and herbaceous plants or on decaying vegetables.

== Subspecies ==
- Mimela junii calabrica Machatschke, 1952
- Mimela junii gigliocola Machatschke, 1952
- Mimela junii junii (Duftschmid, 1805)
- Mimela junii rugosula (Fairmaire, 1859
