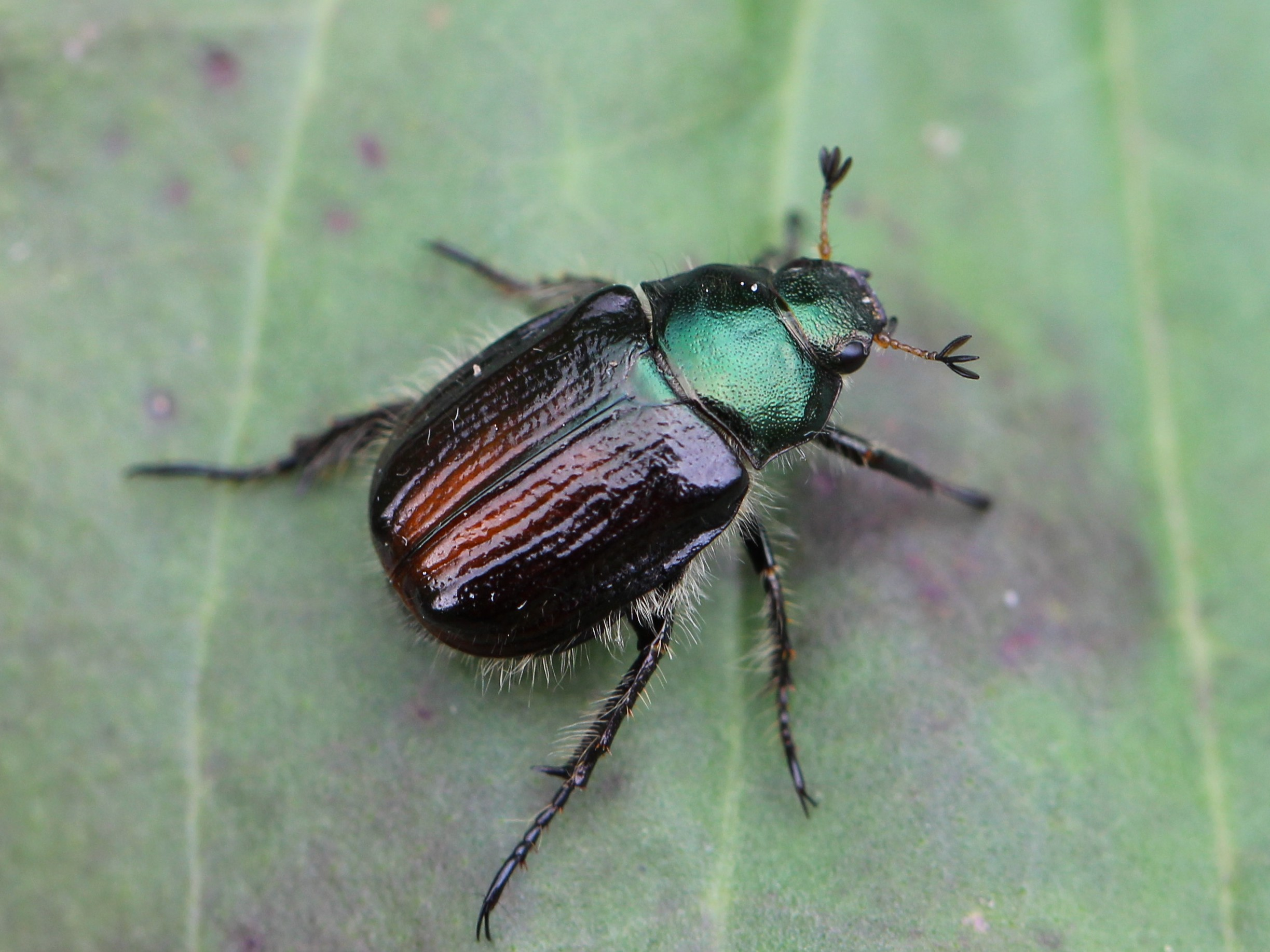
- Phyllopertha horticola

Scientific classification
- Domain: Eukaryota
- Kingdom: Animalia
- Phylum: Arthropoda
- Class: Insecta
- Order: Coleoptera
- Suborder: Polyphaga
- Infraorder: Scarabaeiformia
- Family: Scarabaeidae
- Subfamily: Rutelinae
- Tribe: Anomalini
- Genus: Phyllopertha; Stephens 1830

= Phyllopertha =

Genus of insects

Phyllopertha is a genus of shining leaf chafers in the beetle family Scarabaeidae. There are more than 20 described species in Phyllopertha, found primarily in the Palearctic.

== Species ==
These 26 species belong to the genus Phyllopertha:

- Phyllopertha abullosa Linnaeus, 1988
- Phyllopertha bifasciata Linnaeus, 1966
- Phyllopertha brevipilosa Linnaeus, 1988
- Phyllopertha carinicollis Ohaus, 1905
- Phyllopertha chalcoides Ohaus, 1925
- Phyllopertha diversa Waterhouse, 1875
- Phyllopertha euchroma (Fairmaire, 1891)
- Phyllopertha glabripennis Medvedev, 1949
- Phyllopertha horticola (Linnaeus, 1758)
- Phyllopertha horticoloides Linnaeus, 1965
- Phyllopertha humeralis Fairmaire, 1887
- Phyllopertha intermixta (Arrow, 1913)
- Phyllopertha irregularis Waterhouse, 1875
- Phyllopertha latevittata Fairmaire, 1889
- Phyllopertha latitarsis Nonfried, 1891
- Phyllopertha obscuricolor Fairmaire, 1891
- Phyllopertha puncticollis Reitter, 1888
- Phyllopertha punctigera (Fairmaire, 1888)
- Phyllopertha sublimbata Fairmaire, 1900
- Phyllopertha suturata Fairmaire, 1887
- Phyllopertha suzukii Sawada, 1943
- Phyllopertha taiwana Li & Yang, 1997
- Phyllopertha virgulata Fairmaire, 1889
- Phyllopertha wassuensis Frey, 1971
- Phyllopertha yangi L.i.Kobayashi, 1995
- Phyllopertha zea Reitter, 1903
