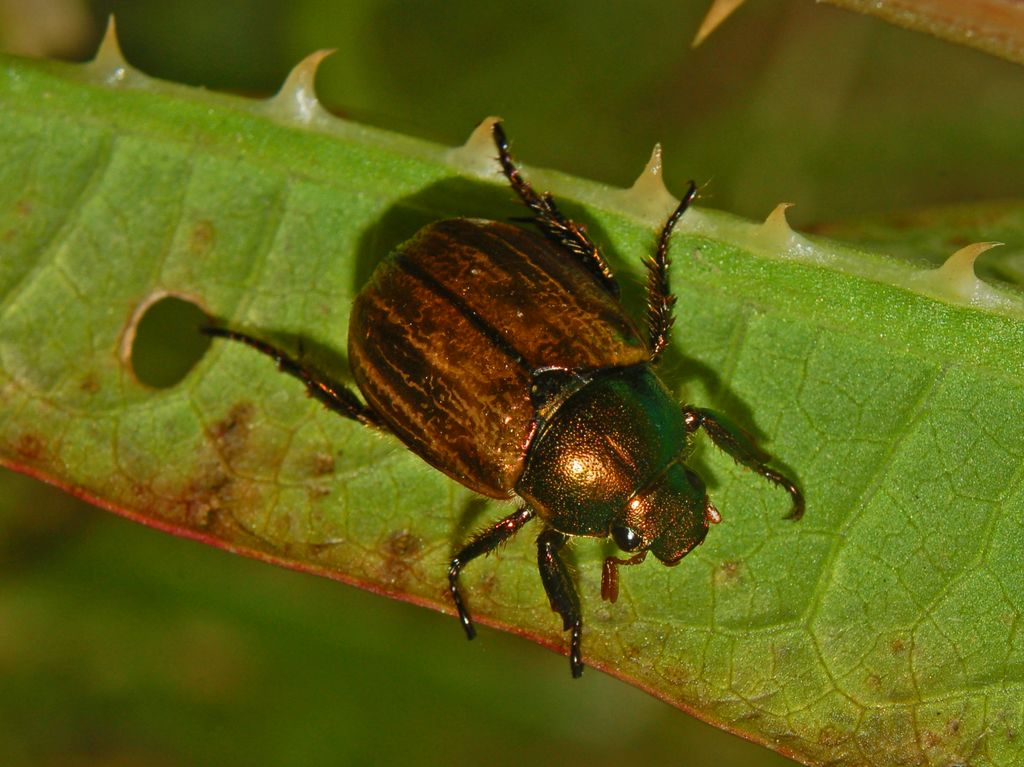
- Mimela junii

Scientific classification
- Kingdom: Animalia
- Phylum: Arthropoda
- Clade: Pancrustacea
- Class: Insecta
- Order: Coleoptera
- Suborder: Polyphaga
- Infraorder: Scarabaeiformia
- Family: Scarabaeidae
- Subfamily: Rutelinae
- Tribe: Anomalini
- Genus: Mimela; Kirby, 1823

= Mimela =

Genus of beetles

Mimela is a genus of shining leaf chafer belonging to the family Scarabaeidae subfamily Rutelinae.

== Species ==
Species within this genus include:

- Mimela abdominalis
- Mimela aenigma
- Mimela amabilis
- Mimela amauropyga
- Mimela anopunctata
- Mimela antiqua
- Mimela argopuroensis
- Mimela arrowi
- Mimela atkinsoni
- Mimela aurata
- Mimela bicolor
- Mimela bidentata
- Mimela bifoveolata
- Mimela bimaculata
- Mimela blumei
- Mimela brancuccii
- Mimela cariniventris
- Mimela catolasia
- Mimela celebica
- Mimela chalcophora
- Mimela chinensis
- Mimela chrysoprasa
- Mimela circumcincta
- Mimela condophora
- Mimela confucius
- Mimela costata
- Mimela coxalis
- Mimela crocea
- Mimela cupricollis
- Mimela cyanipes
- Mimela debilis
- Mimela decolorata
- Mimela dehaani
- Mimela dentifera
- Mimela deretzi
- Mimela despumata
- Mimela dimorpha
- Mimela discalis
- Mimela discoidea
- Mimela epipleurica
- Mimela euchloroides
- Mimela excisipes
- Mimela exicisifemorata
- Mimela felschei
- Mimela ferreroi
- Mimela flavilabris
- Mimela flavipes
- Mimela flavocincta
- Mimela flavomarginata
- Mimela flavoviridis
- Mimela foveola
- Mimela fruhstorferi
- Mimela fukiensis
- Mimela fulgidivittata
- Mimela furvipes
- Mimela fusania
- Mimela fusciventris
- Mimela gabonensis
- Mimela gentingensis
- Mimela glabra
- Mimela globosa
- Mimela grubaueri
- Mimela hauseri
- Mimela heterochropus
- Mimela hirtipyga
- Mimela holochalcea
- Mimela holosericea
- Mimela horsfieldi
- Mimela ignicauda
- Mimela ignicollis
- Mimela ignistriata
- Mimela immarginata
- Mimela inoei
- Mimela inscripta
- Mimela insularis
- Mimela iris
- Mimela javana
- Mimela junii
- Mimela kalesarensis
- Mimela klapperichi
- Mimela klossi
- Mimela laevicollis
- Mimela laevigata
- Mimela langbianica
- Mimela laotina
- Mimela leei
- Mimela leporalis
- Mimela lissoptera
- Mimela longicornis
- Mimela lutea
- Mimela luteoviridis
- Mimela macassara
- Mimela macleayana
- Mimela maculicollis
- Mimela malaisei
- Mimela malicolor
- Mimela margarita
- Mimela marginalis
- Mimela mercarae
- Mimela mirai
- Mimela mundissima
- Mimela nana
- Mimela ngoclinhensis
- Mimela nigritarsis
- Mimela nigrosellata
- Mimela nishimurai
- Mimela noramlyi
- Mimela nozomi
- Mimela nubeculata
- Mimela ohausi
- Mimela opalina
- Mimela pachygastra
- Mimela palauana
- Mimela pallidicauda
- Mimela parva
- Mimela passerinii
- Mimela pectoralis
- Mimela pekinensis
- Mimela piceoviridana
- Mimela pirosca
- Mimela plicatulla
- Mimela politicollis
- Mimela pomicolor
- Mimela prilca
- Mimela princeps
- Mimela puella
- Mimela punctulata
- Mimela pygidialis
- Mimela pygmaea
- Mimela pyriformis
- Mimela rectangular
- Mimela repsimoides
- Mimela rubrivirgata
- Mimela rufoprasina
- Mimela rugatipennis
- Mimela rugicollis
- Mimela rugulosipennis
- Mimela runsorica
- Mimela ruyuanensis
- Mimela sakishimana
- Mimela sauteri
- Mimela schoutedeni
- Mimela seminigra
- Mimela sericea
- Mimela sericicollis
- Mimela sericopyga
- Mimela signaticollis
- Mimela siliguria
- Mimela sparsepilosa
- Mimela specularis
- Mimela splendens
- Mimela sulcatula
- Mimela suspecta
- Mimela taiwana
- Mimela takemurai
- Mimela testacea
- Mimela testaceoviridis
- Mimela tonkinensis
- Mimela trichiopyga
- Mimela tristicula
- Mimela uenoi
- Mimela unicolor
- Mimela ussuriensis
- Mimela werneri
- Mimela vernicata
- Mimela vicaria
- Mimela viridilatera
- Mimela viriditestacea
- Mimela vitalisi
- Mimela vittaticollis
- Mimela xanthorrhina
- Mimela xanthorrhoea
- Mimela xutholoma
- Mimela yonaguniensis
- Mimela yunnana
- Mimela zorni
