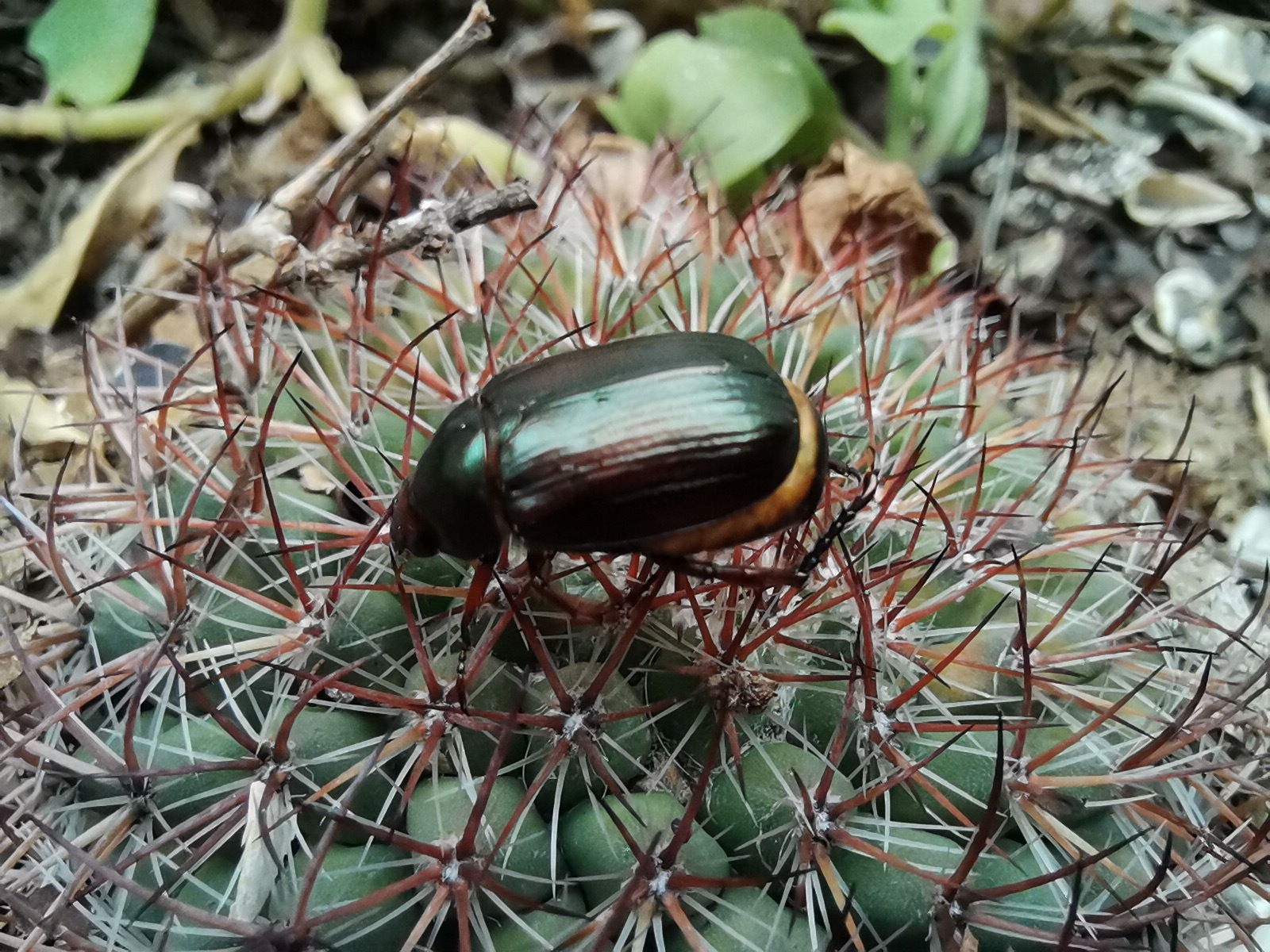
- Paranomala cincta, México

Scientific classification
- Kingdom: Animalia
- Phylum: Arthropoda
- Class: Insecta
- Order: Coleoptera
- Suborder: Polyphaga
- Infraorder: Scarabaeiformia
- Family: Scarabaeidae
- Subfamily: Rutelinae
- Tribe: Anomalini
- Genus: Paranomala; Casey, 1915

Synonyms
- Anomalacra Casey, 1915

= Paranomala =

Genus of beetles

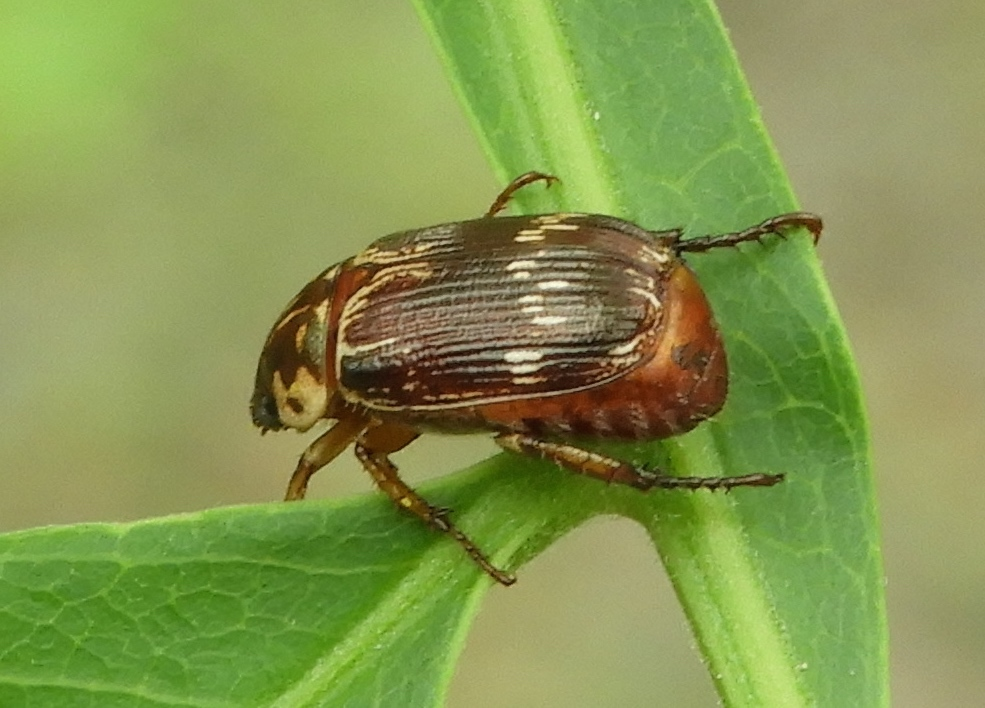
Paranomala histrionella, México

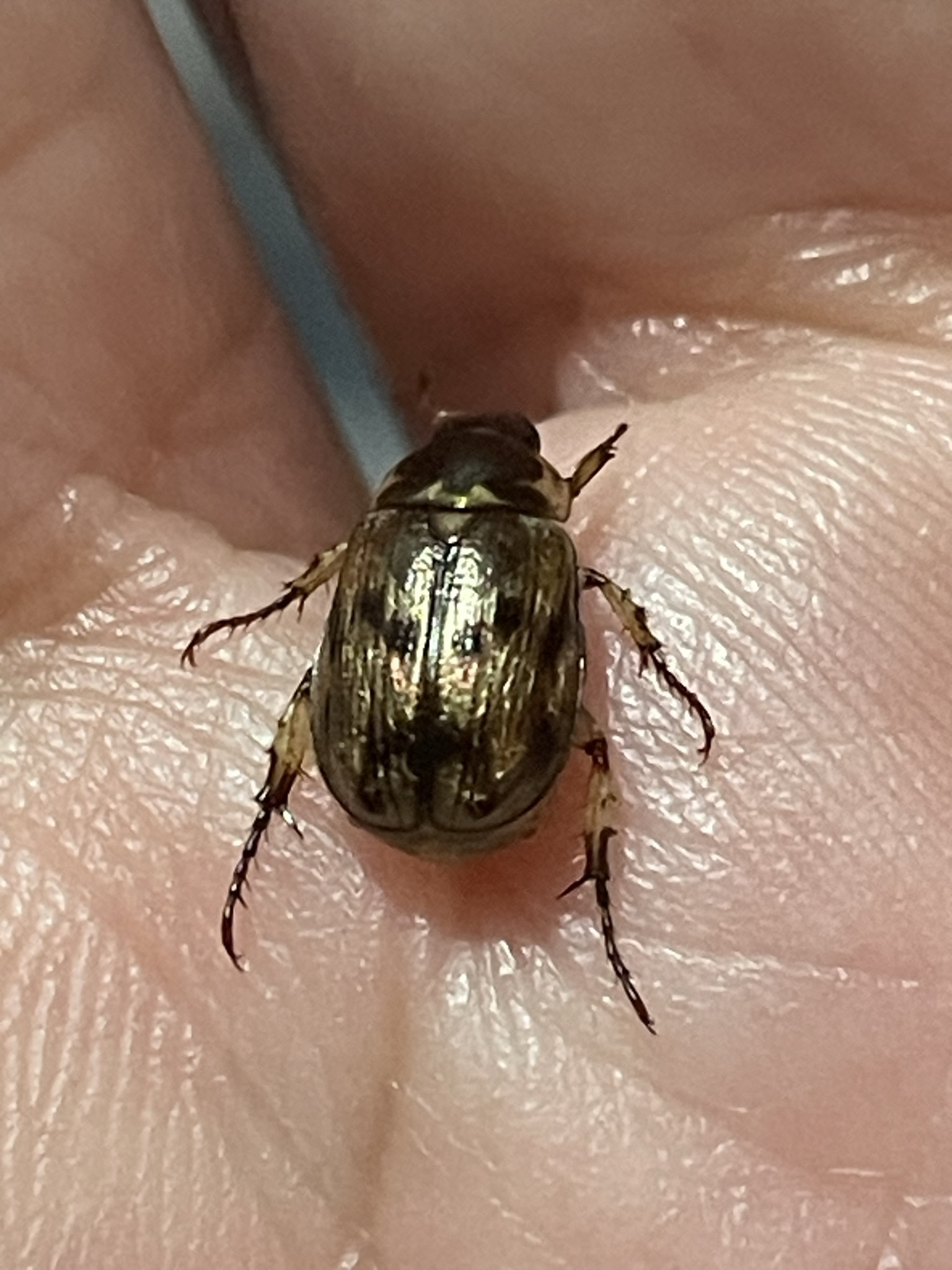
Paranomala undulata, Perú

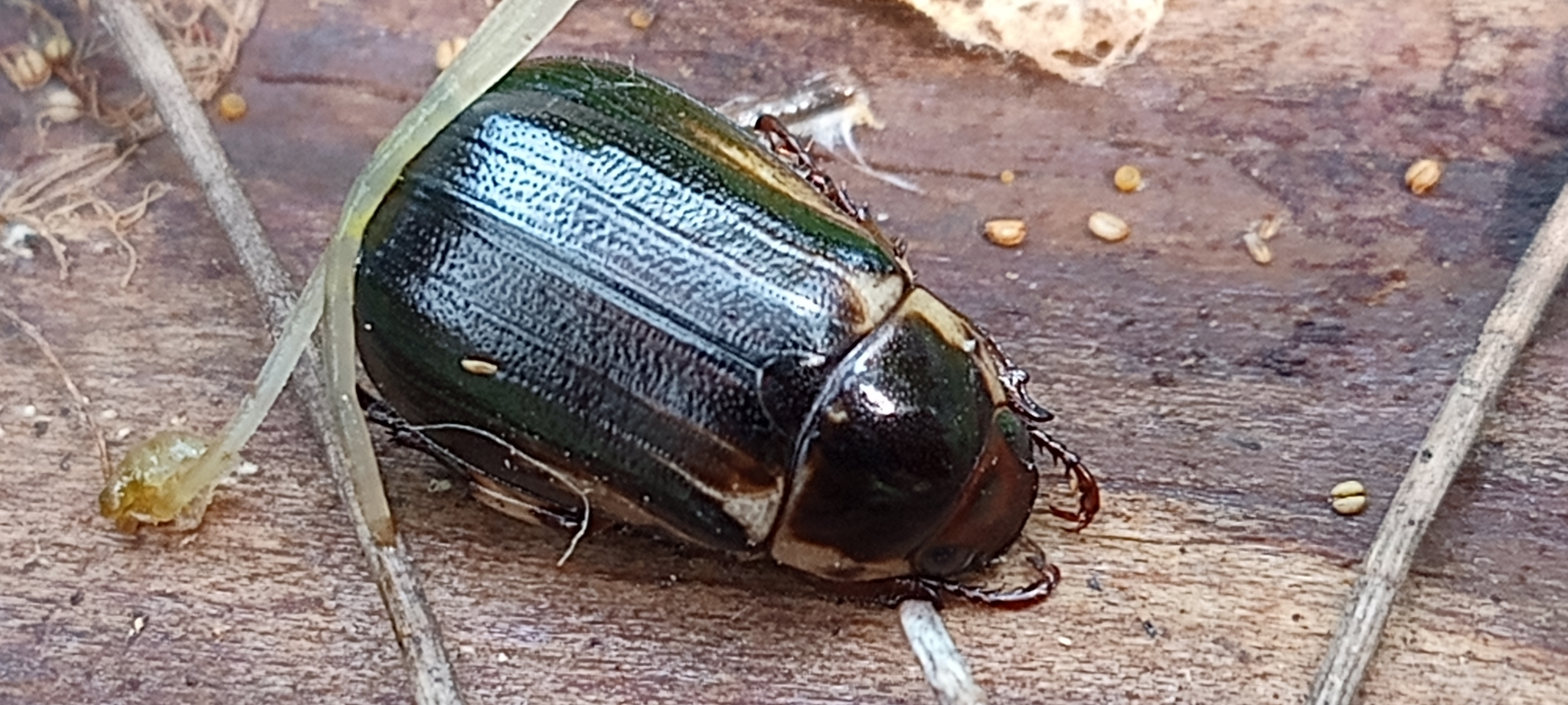
Paranomala inconstans, México

Paranomala is a genus of shining leaf chafers in the beetle family Scarabaeidae. There are more than 190 described species in Paranomala, found in North, Central, and South America.

Under the provisions of the ICZN this genus is considered a junior synonym of the genus Anomalacra.

== Species ==
These 197 species belong to the genus Paranomala:

- Paranomala adscita (Robinson, 1941)
- Paranomala aereiventris (Filippini, Micó & Galante, 2015)
- Paranomala amphicoma (Bates, 1888)
- Paranomala antennata (Schaeffer, 1906)
- Paranomala antica (Ohaus, 1897)
- Paranomala arara (Ohaus, 1897)
- Paranomala arida (Casey, 1915)
- Paranomala aspersa (Filippini, Micó & Galante, 2015)
- Paranomala atomogramma (Bates, 1888)
- Paranomala atrivillosa (Filippini, Micó & Galante, 2015)
- Paranomala attenuata (Bates, 1888)
- Paranomala ayjikcala (Morón & Nogueira, 2002)
- Paranomala balzapambae (Ohaus, 1897)
- Paranomala barbicollis (Bates, 1888)
- Paranomala batesi (Ohaus, 1902)
- Paranomala beckeri (Ohaus, 1897)
- Paranomala beckeriana Ramírez-Ponce & Morón, 2012
- Paranomala bimaculata (Blanchard, 1851)
- Paranomala binotata (Gyllenhal, 1817)
- Paranomala boliviana (Ohaus, 1897)
- Paranomala bruchiana (Ohaus, 1911)
- Paranomala brunnipennis (Gyllenhal, 1817)
- Paranomala calceata (Chevrolat, 1865)
- Paranomala calligrapha (Bates, 1888)
- Paranomala capito (Ohaus, 1897)
- Paranomala carinifrons (Bates, 1888)
- Paranomala castaniceps (Bates, 1888)
- Paranomala catoxantha (Burmeister, 1855)
- Paranomala cavifrons (LeConte, 1868)
- Paranomala centralis (LeConte, 1863)
- Paranomala championi (Bates, 1888)
- Paranomala chapini (Robinson, 1948)
- Paranomala chevrolati (Bates, 1888)
- Paranomala chiriquina (Bates, 1888)
- Paranomala chromicolor (Burmeister, 1855)
- Paranomala cinaedias (Filippini, Micó & Galante, 2016)
- Paranomala cincta (Say, 1835)
- Paranomala clarivillosa (Filippini, Micó & Galante, 2015)
- Paranomala clathrata (Ohaus, 1930)
- Paranomala clypealis (Schaeffer, 1907)
- Paranomala cnethopyga (Bates, 1888)
- Paranomala colonica (Casey, 1915)
- Paranomala columbica (Ohaus, 1902)
- Paranomala compressicollis (Bates, 1888)
- Paranomala corcovada Ramírez-Ponce, Bitar & Curoe, 2014
- Paranomala crassisura (Casey, 1915)
- Paranomala cribriceps (Bates, 1888)
- Paranomala crinicollis (Ohaus, 1902)
- Paranomala crucialis (Casey, 1915)
- Paranomala cupricollis (Chevrolat, 1834)
- Paranomala decolor (Bates, 1888)
- Paranomala delicata (Casey, 1915)
- Paranomala denticollis (Bates, 1888)
- Paranomala digressa (Casey, 1915)
- Paranomala discoidalis (Bates, 1888)
- Paranomala donovani (Stephens, 1830)
- Paranomala doryphorina (Bates, 1888)
- Paranomala ellipsis (Casey, 1915)
- Paranomala eucoma (Bates, 1888)
- Paranomala eulissa (Bates, 1888)
- Paranomala eusticta (Filippini, Micó & Galante, 2015)
- Paranomala flamina (Ohaus, 1933)
- Paranomala flavilla (Bates, 1888)
- Paranomala flavipennis (Burmeister, 1844)
- Paranomala flavizona (Bates, 1888)
- Paranomala flohri (Ohaus, 1897)
- Paranomala flohriana Ramírez-Ponce & Morón, 2012
- Paranomala foraminosa (Bates, 1888)
- Paranomala forreri (Bates, 1888)
- Paranomala forreriana Ramírez-Ponce & Morón, 2012
- Paranomala forstroemi (Billberg, 1820)
- Paranomala foveiceps (Ohaus, 1897)
- Paranomala fulgidicollis (Blanchard, 1851)
- Paranomala fulvocostata (Ohaus, 1902)
- Paranomala gemella (Say, 1835)
- Paranomala globulata (Filippini, Micó & Galante, 2015)
- Paranomala guatemalena (Bates, 1888)
- Paranomala hardyorum (Potts, 1976)
- Paranomala hiata (Filippini, Micó & Galante, 2015)
- Paranomala hispidipennis (Ohaus, 1897)
- Paranomala hispidula (Bates, 1888)
- Paranomala histrionella (Bates, 1888)
- Paranomala hoegei (Ohaus, 1897)
- Paranomala hoegeiana Ramírez-Ponce & Morón, 2012
- Paranomala hoepfneri (Bates, 1888)
- Paranomala hoppi (Ohaus, 1928)
- Paranomala hylobia (Ohaus, 1897)
- Paranomala inbio Ramírez-Ponce, Bitar & Curoe, 2014
- Paranomala inconstans (Burmeister, 1844)
- Paranomala innuba (Fabricius, 1787)
- Paranomala insularis (Castelnau, 1840)
- Paranomala irrorata Blanchard, 1851 (poss = Anomala donovani Stephens, 1830 )
- Paranomala juquilensis (Ohaus, 1897)
- Paranomala kanei (Potts, 1976)
- Paranomala laesicollis (Bates, 1888)
- Paranomala latifalculata (Filippini, Micó & Galante, 2015)
- Paranomala leopardina (Filippini, Micó & Galante, 2015)
- Paranomala levicollis (Filippini, Micó & Galante, 2015)
- Paranomala ligulipes (Ohaus, 1897)
- Paranomala limbaticollis (Blanchard, 1851)
- Paranomala longipennis (Casey, 1915)
- Paranomala longisacculata (Filippini, Micó & Galante, 2015)
- Paranomala lucicola (Fabricius, 1798)
- Paranomala ludoviciana (Schaeffer, 1906)
- Paranomala marginicollis (Bates, 1888)
- Paranomala medellina (Ohaus, 1897)
- Paranomala megalia (Bates, 1888)
- Paranomala megalops (Bates, 1888)
- Paranomala mendica (Casey, 1915)
- Paranomala mesocnemis (Ohaus, 1902)
- Paranomala m-fuscum (Filippini, Micó & Galante, 2015)
- Paranomala micans (Burmeister, 1844)
- Paranomala millepora (Bates, 1888)
- Paranomala minuta (Burmeister, 1844)
- Paranomala mixeana (Morón & Nogueira, 2002)
- Paranomala moroni (Filippini, Micó & Galante, 2015)
- Paranomala mutabilis (Ohaus, 1897)
- Paranomala nimbosa (Casey, 1915)
- Paranomala nitescens (Bates, 1888)
- Paranomala nogueiraiana Ramírez-Ponce & Morón, 2012
- Paranomala oblivia (Horn, 1884)
- Paranomala obovata (Ohaus, 1933)
- Paranomala ochrogastra (Bates, 1888)
- Paranomala ochroptera (Bates, 1888)
- Paranomala oreas (Ohaus, 1897)
- Paranomala parvaeucoma (Filippini, Micó & Galante, 2015)
- Paranomala parvula (Burmeister, 1844)
- Paranomala peninsularis (Schaeffer, 1906)
- Paranomala pernambucana (Ohaus, 1902)
- Paranomala perspicax (Filippini, Micó & Galante, 2015)
- Paranomala phosphora (Bates, 1888)
- Paranomala piccolina (Filippini, Micó & Galante, 2015)
- Paranomala picturella (Morón & Nogueira, 2002)
- Paranomala pilosipennis (Ohaus, 1897)
- Paranomala pincelada (Filippini, Galante & Micó, 2015)
- Paranomala plurisulcata (Bates, 1888)
- Paranomala polygona (Bates, 1888)
- Paranomala popayana (Ohaus, 1897)
- Paranomala praecellens (Bates, 1888)
- Paranomala punctatipennis (Blanchard, 1851)
- Paranomala pupillata (Burmeister, 1844)
- Paranomala quiche (Ohaus, 1897)
- Paranomala quirina (Ohaus, 1933)
- Paranomala repressa (Ohaus, 1908)
- Paranomala retusicollis (Bates, 1888)
- Paranomala rhizotrogoides (Blanchard, 1851)
- Paranomala rhodope (Bates, 1888)
- Paranomala robiginosa (Filippini, Galante & Micó, 2015)
- Paranomala ruatana (Bates, 1888)
- Paranomala salticola (Ohaus, 1897)
- Paranomala schaefferi (Seidel, 2021)
- Paranomala sejuncta (Bates, 1888)
- Paranomala semicincta (Bates, 1888)
- Paranomala semilivida (LeConte, 1878)
- Paranomala semitonsa (Bates, 1888)
- Paranomala simillima (Ohaus, 1897)
- Paranomala simulans (Casey, 1915)
- Paranomala smithiana Ramírez-Ponce & Morón, 2012
- Paranomala sticticoptera (Blanchard, 1851)
- Paranomala stillaticia (Filippini, Micó & Galante, 2015)
- Paranomala strigicollis (Ohaus, 1902)
- Paranomala suavis (Potts, 1976)
- Paranomala subaenea (Nonfried, 1893)
- Paranomala subridens (Filippini, Micó & Galante, 2015)
- Paranomala subusta (Filippini, Micó & Galante, 2015)
- Paranomala sulcans
- Paranomala sylphis (Bates, 1888)
- Paranomala techacapana (Morón & Nogueira, 2002)
- Paranomala tenera (Casey, 1915)
- Paranomala tenoriensis (Filippini, Micó & Galante, 2015)
- Paranomala terroni (Morón & Nogueira, 1998)
- Paranomala terronoides (Morón & Nogueira, 2002)
- Paranomala tessellatipennis (Blanchard, 1851)
- Paranomala testaceipennis (Blanchard, 1851)
- Paranomala tindakua (Morón & Nogueira, 2002)
- Paranomala tolensis (Bates, 1888)
- Paranomala tolucana (Ohaus, 1902)
- Paranomala trapezifera (Bates, 1888)
- Paranomala tricostulata (Ohaus, 1897)
- Paranomala tuberculata (Filippini, Micó & Galante, 2015)
- Paranomala umbra (Casey, 1915)
- Paranomala undulata (Melsheimer, 1845)
- Paranomala valida (Burmeister, 1844)
- Paranomala vallisneria (Filippini, Micó & Galante, 2015)
- Paranomala vanpatteni (Bates, 1888)
- Paranomala variolata (Bates, 1888)
- Paranomala variolosa (Ohaus, 1928)
- Paranomala vayana (Ohaus, 1930)
- Paranomala veraecrucis (Bates, 1888)
- Paranomala vespertilio (Ohaus, 1902)
- Paranomala vicenti (Franz, 1955)
- Paranomala villosella (Blanchard, 1851)
- Paranomala violacea (Burmeister, 1844)
- Paranomala vulcanicola (Ohaus, 1897)
- Paranomala werneri (Howden, 1955)
- Paranomala zapotensis (Bates, 1888)
- Paranomala zaragozai Ramírez-Ponce, 2011
