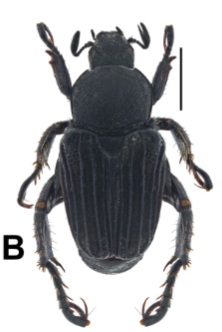

Scientific classification
- Kingdom: Animalia
- Phylum: Arthropoda
- Clade: Pancrustacea
- Class: Insecta
- Order: Coleoptera
- Suborder: Polyphaga
- Infraorder: Scarabaeiformia
- Family: Scarabaeidae
- Genus: Strigoderma
- Species: S. tenebrosa

Binomial name
- Strigoderma tenebrosa Delgado & Mora-Aguilar, 2012

= Strigoderma tenebrosa =

Species of beetle

Strigoderma tenebrosa is a species of beetle of the family Scarabaeidae. It is found in Mexico (Chiapas).

== Description ==
Adults reach a length of about 7.7 mm (0.30 in). They are completely black, with greenish reflections mainly on the protarsus. The pronotum has dense and fine punctures, and projecting anterior angles. The elytra have seven ridges.

== Life history ==
They have been collected from corn plants and tropical deciduous forest areas at 600 meters a.s.l.

== Etymology ==
The species name is derived from Latin tenebrosus, tenebra (meaning darkness) and refers to its intense dark colour.
