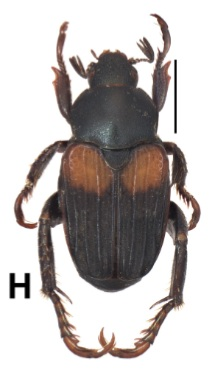

Scientific classification
- Kingdom: Animalia
- Phylum: Arthropoda
- Clade: Pancrustacea
- Class: Insecta
- Order: Coleoptera
- Suborder: Polyphaga
- Infraorder: Scarabaeiformia
- Family: Scarabaeidae
- Genus: Strigoderma
- Species: S. borealis

Binomial name
- Strigoderma borealis Andalco-Cid & Ramírez-Ponce, 2026

= Strigoderma borealis =

Species of beetle

Strigoderma borealis is a species of beetle of the family Scarabaeidae. It is found in Mexico (Nayarit).

== Description ==
Adults reach a length of about 6.56 mm (0.258 in). The body is completely black, except for a wide orange spot on the first third of each elytron. The tibiae are apically reddish and the tarsi and claws have a deeper reddish tone.

== Life history ==
Its feeding habits and life cycle are unknown. Adults were collected in June and July.

== Etymology ==
The species name is derived from Latin borealis (relating to the north or boreas) as this species has the most northerly distribution of any species of the subgenus Costatergus described so far.
