= Strigoderma arboricola =

Scientific classification
- Kingdom: Animalia
- Phylum: Arthropoda
- Clade: Pancrustacea
- Class: Insecta
- Order: Coleoptera
- Suborder: Polyphaga
- Infraorder: Scarabaeiformia
- Family: Scarabaeidae
- Genus: Strigoderma
- Species: S. arboricola

Binomial name
- Strigoderma arboricola (Fabricius, 1793)

Synonyms
- Strigoderma angustula Casey, 1915; Strigoderma irregularis Casey, 1915; Strigoderma obesula Casey, 1915; Strigoderma puritana Casey, 1915; Strigoderma quaternaria Casey, 1915; Strigoderma testaceipennis Nonfried, 1893; Strigoderma texana Casey, 1915; Strigoderma virginica Casey, 1915

Species of beetle

Strigoderma arboricola, known generally as sand chafer, is a species of shining leaf chafer in the family of beetles known as Scarabaeidae. Other common names include the spring rose beetle, false Japanese beetle, and rose chafer.
