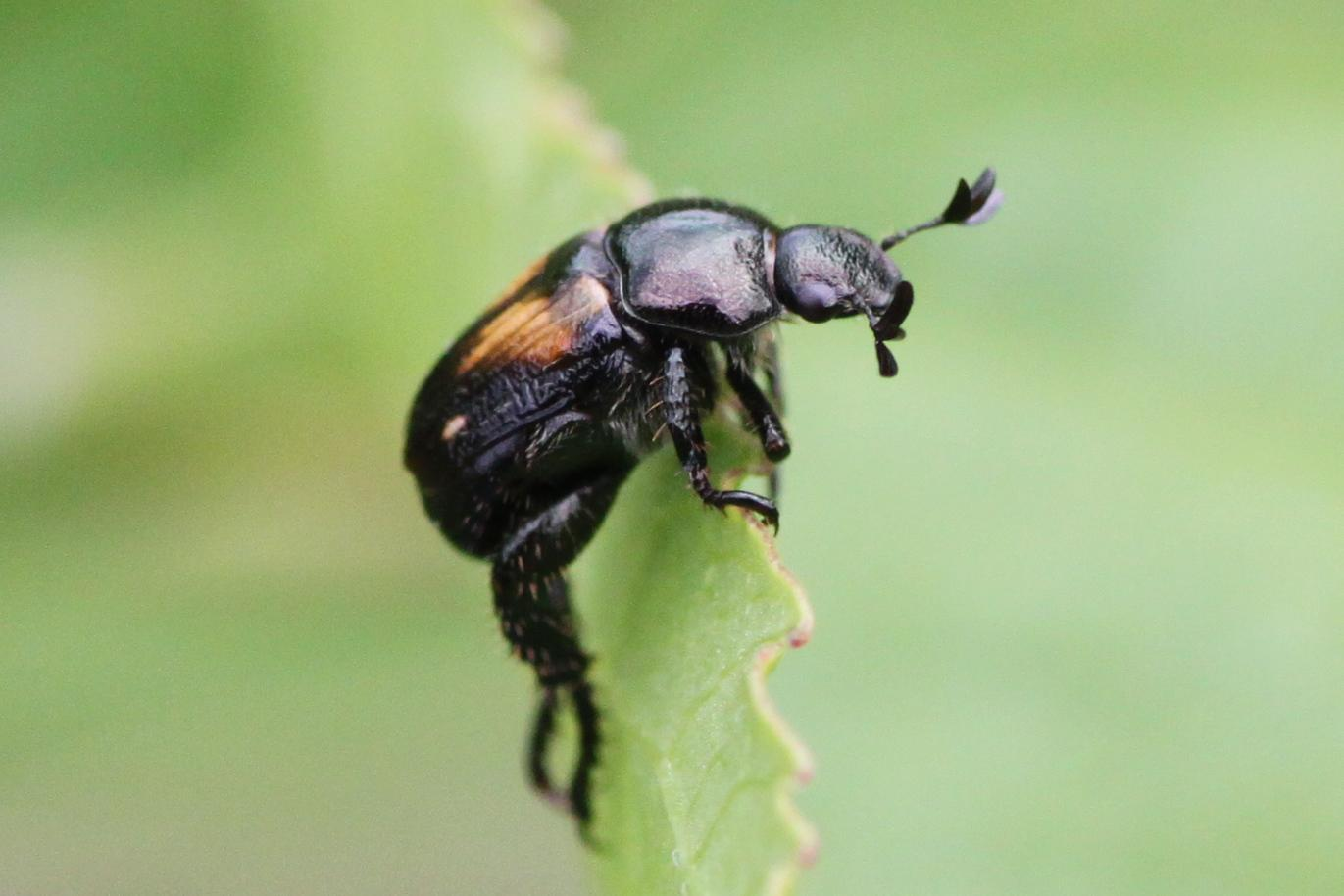
- Strigoderma pygmaea

Scientific classification
- Kingdom: Animalia
- Phylum: Arthropoda
- Clade: Pancrustacea
- Class: Insecta
- Order: Coleoptera
- Suborder: Polyphaga
- Infraorder: Scarabaeiformia
- Family: Scarabaeidae
- Genus: Strigoderma
- Species: S. pygmaea

Binomial name
- Strigoderma pygmaea (Fabricius, 1798)

Synonyms
- Melolontha minima Drapiez, 1819; Strigoderma floridana Ohaus, 1905

= Strigoderma pygmaea =

Species of beetle

Strigoderma pygmaea, the pygmy chafer, is a species of shining leaf chafer in the family of beetles known as Scarabaeidae.
