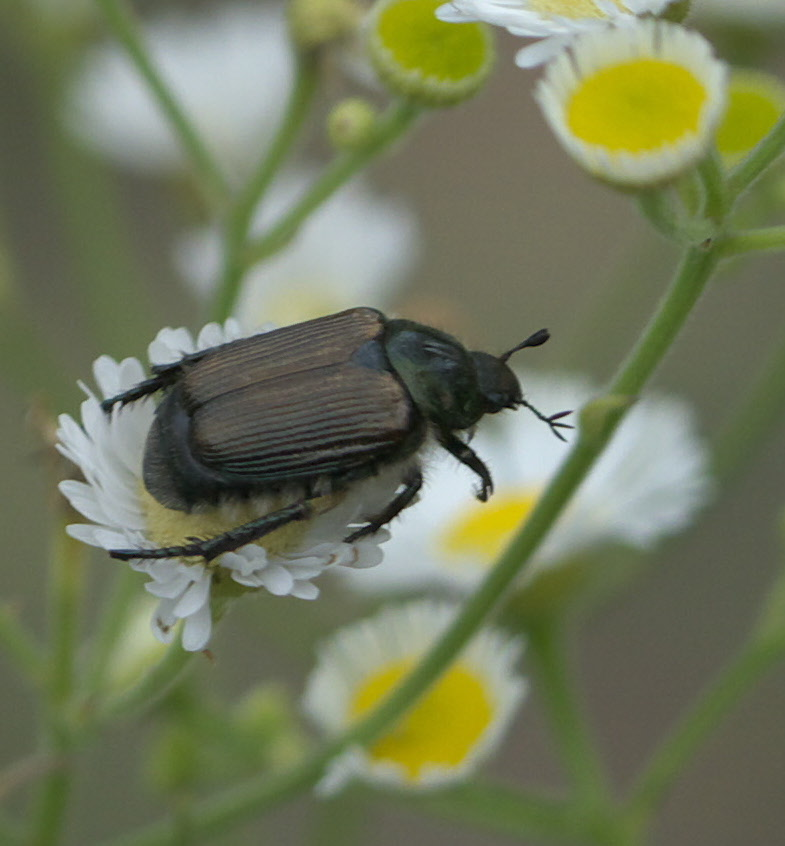
- Strigoderma pimalis

Scientific classification
- Kingdom: Animalia
- Phylum: Arthropoda
- Clade: Pancrustacea
- Class: Insecta
- Order: Coleoptera
- Suborder: Polyphaga
- Infraorder: Scarabaeiformia
- Family: Scarabaeidae
- Genus: Strigoderma
- Species: S. pimalis

Binomial name
- Strigoderma pimalis Casey, 1884

Synonyms
- Strigoderma prolixella Casey, 1915; Strigoderma sonorica Casey, 1915; Strigoderma subrutilans Casey, 1915; Strigoderma viridicollis Schaeffer, 1907

= Strigoderma pimalis =

Species of beetle

Strigoderma pimalis is a species of shining leaf chafer in the family Scarabaeidae.
