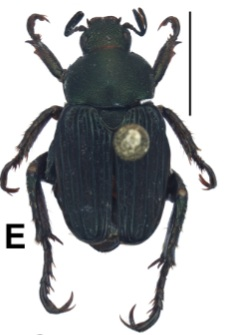

Scientific classification
- Kingdom: Animalia
- Phylum: Arthropoda
- Clade: Pancrustacea
- Class: Insecta
- Order: Coleoptera
- Suborder: Polyphaga
- Infraorder: Scarabaeiformia
- Family: Scarabaeidae
- Genus: Strigoderma
- Species: S. grossipenis

Binomial name
- Strigoderma grossipenis Andalco-Cid & Ramírez-Ponce, 2026

= Strigoderma grossipenis =

Species of beetle

Strigoderma grossipenis is a species of beetle of the family Scarabaeidae. It is found in Mexico (Guerrero).

== Description ==
Adults reach a length of about 6.5 mm (0.26 in). The head and legs are shiny coppery black, the frons and clypeus with greenish reflections. The rest of the body is completely black with greenish reflections.

== Life history ==
Feeding habits and life cycle are unknown. The holotype was collected in November.

== Etymology ==
The species name is derived from Latin grossus (meaning thick) and penis (meaning tail, penis) and refers to the notable thickness of the parameres in this species.
