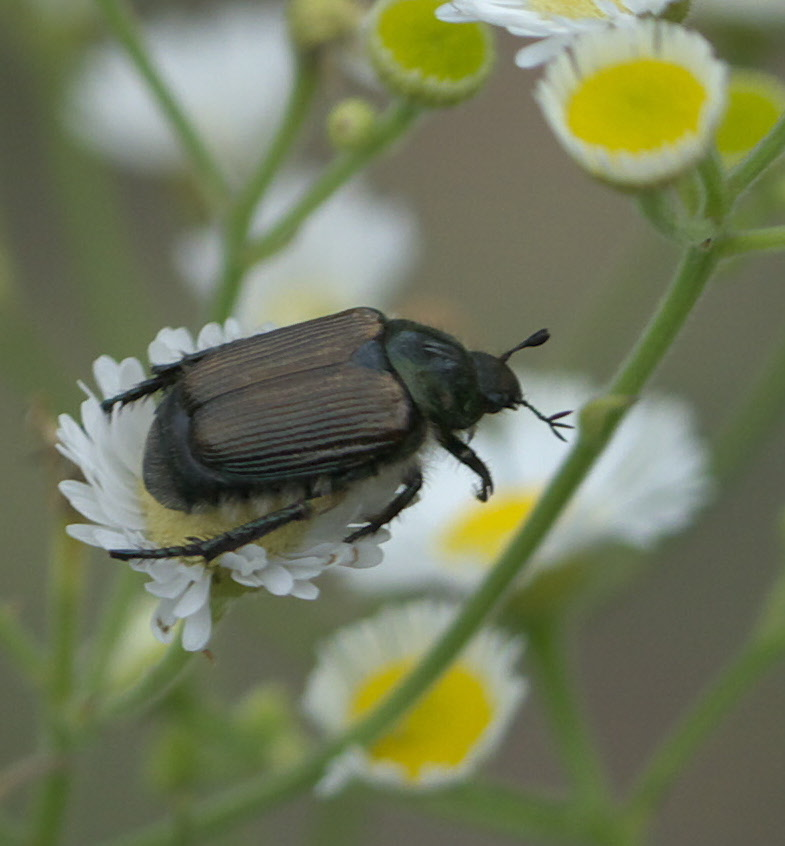

Scientific classification
- Kingdom: Animalia
- Phylum: Arthropoda
- Clade: Pancrustacea
- Class: Insecta
- Order: Coleoptera
- Suborder: Polyphaga
- Infraorder: Scarabaeiformia
- Family: Scarabaeidae
- Tribe: Anomalini
- Genus: Strigoderma; Burmeister, 1844

Synonyms
- Alamona Casey, 1915; Strigodermella Casey, 1915

= Strigoderma =

Genus of beetles

Strigoderma is a genus of shining leaf chafers in the family Scarabaeidae. There are about 9 described species in Strigoderma.

== Species ==
- subgenus Strigoderma
  - Strigoderma angulicollis Ohaus, 1915
  - Strigoderma arboricola (Fabricius, 1792) (sand chafer)
  - Strigoderma auriventris Bates, 1888
  - Strigoderma biolleyi Ohaus, 1908
  - Strigoderma castor (Newman, 1838)
  - Strigoderma catamaya Ohaus, 1915
  - Strigoderma chalybeicollis Blanchard, 1851
  - Strigoderma columbica Burmeister, 1844
  - Strigoderma contracta Bates, 1888
  - Strigoderma costarica Katbeh-bader, 2000
  - Strigoderma costulata Nonfried, 1893
  - Strigoderma festiva Bates, 1888
  - Strigoderma floricola Ohaus, 1908
  - Strigoderma guatimalicus Katbeh-bader, 2000
  - Strigoderma haenschi Ohaus, 1902
  - Strigoderma heraldica Nonfried, 1893
  - Strigoderma knausi (Brown, 1925)
  - Strigoderma lampra Bates, 1888
  - Strigoderma longicollis Bates, 1888
  - Strigoderma marginata (Olivier, 1789)
  - Strigoderma mexicana Blanchard, 1851
  - Strigoderma micans Nonfried, 1893
  - Strigoderma ngabe Ramírez-Ponce & Curoe, 2014
  - Strigoderma nodulosa Ohaus, 1902
  - Strigoderma orbicularis Burmeister, 1855
  - Strigoderma peruviensis Blanchard, 1851
  - Strigoderma physopleura Bates, 1888
  - Strigoderma pimalis Casey, 1885
  - Strigoderma popillioides Benderitter, 1925
  - Strigoderma presidii Bates, 1889
  - Strigoderma protea Burmeister, 1844
  - Strigoderma pygmaea (Fabricius, 1798) (pygmy chafer)
  - Strigoderma rutelina Bates, 1888
  - Strigoderma sallaei Bates, 1888
  - Strigoderma sulcipennis Burmeister, 1844
  - Strigoderma teapensis Bates, 1888
  - Strigoderma tomentosa Bates, 1888
  - Strigoderma tucumana Ohaus, 1902
  - Strigoderma vestita Burmeister, 1844
  - Strigoderma villosula Blanchard, 1851
- subgenus Costatergus Ramírez-Ponce & Andalco-Cid, 2026
  - Strigoderma borealis Ramírez-Ponce & Andalco-Cid, 2026
  - Strigoderma costulipennis Bates, 1888
  - Strigoderma grossipenis Ramírez-Ponce & Andalco-Cid, 2026
  - Strigoderma juliani Ramírez-Ponce & Andalco-Cid, 2026
  - Strigoderma paucipunctata Ramírez-Ponce & Andalco-Cid, 2026
  - Strigoderma tenebrosa Delgado & Mora-Aguilar, 2012
  - Strigoderma uniungula Ramírez-Ponce & Andalco-Cid, 2026
  - Strigoderma vulcanica Ramírez-Ponce & Andalco-Cid, 2026
