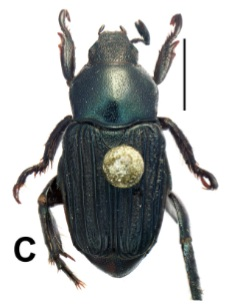

Scientific classification
- Kingdom: Animalia
- Phylum: Arthropoda
- Clade: Pancrustacea
- Class: Insecta
- Order: Coleoptera
- Suborder: Polyphaga
- Infraorder: Scarabaeiformia
- Family: Scarabaeidae
- Genus: Strigoderma
- Species: S. paucipunctata

Binomial name
- Strigoderma paucipunctata Andalco-Cid & Ramírez-Ponce, 2026

= Strigoderma paucipunctata =

Species of beetle

Strigoderma paucipunctata is a species of beetle of the family Scarabaeidae. It is found in Mexico (Chiapas).

== Description ==
Adults reach a length of about 6.77 mm (0.267 in). They are completely black, with intense greenish reflections. The elytra however, are without reflections.

== Life history ==
The feeding habits and life cycle are unknown. The only specimen was collected in June.

== Etymology ==
The species name is derived from Latin pauci (meaning few) and punctum (meaning prick, sharp point) and refers to the scattered punctation of the pronotum.
