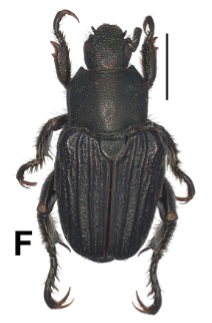

Scientific classification
- Kingdom: Animalia
- Phylum: Arthropoda
- Clade: Pancrustacea
- Class: Insecta
- Order: Coleoptera
- Suborder: Polyphaga
- Infraorder: Scarabaeiformia
- Family: Scarabaeidae
- Genus: Strigoderma
- Species: S. uniungula

Binomial name
- Strigoderma uniungula Andalco-Cid & Ramírez-Ponce, 2026

= Strigoderma uniungula =

Species of beetle

Strigoderma uniungula is a species of beetle of the family Scarabaeidae. It is found in Mexico (Guerrero).

== Description ==
Adults reach a length of about 7.17 mm (0.282 in). The antennal club, pronotum, scutellum and abdomen are black with coppery-greenish reflections, while the apex of the protibia and tarsi are slightly reddish.

== Life history ==
Feeding habits and life cycle are unknown. The holotype was collected in July.

== Etymology ==
The species name is derived from Latin uni (meaning one) and ungula (meaning claw, spur or hoof) and refers to the fact that this species is the only one with a simple internal protarsal claw.
