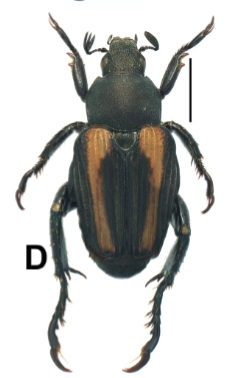

Scientific classification
- Kingdom: Animalia
- Phylum: Arthropoda
- Clade: Pancrustacea
- Class: Insecta
- Order: Coleoptera
- Suborder: Polyphaga
- Infraorder: Scarabaeiformia
- Family: Scarabaeidae
- Genus: Strigoderma
- Species: S. juliani

Binomial name
- Strigoderma juliani Andalco-Cid & Ramírez-Ponce, 2026

= Strigoderma juliani =

Species of beetle

Strigoderma juliani is a species of beetle of the family Scarabaeidae. It is found in Mexico (Oaxaca), where it has been recorded in the Sierra Sur, between 700 and 930 meters a.s.l.

== Description ==
Adults reach a length of about 7.5 mm (0.30 in). The head, pronotum, scutellum and legs are shiny black, with greenish reflections on the clypeus and legs. The elytra are ochre-yellow, with wide black bands longitudinally covering the outer third and a wide area adjacent to the suture. The abdomen is dark reddish black.

== Life history ==
The feeding habits and life cycle of this species are unknown. Specimens were collected in June and August.

== Etymology ==
The species is dedicated to the entomologist Julián Hernández Cruz, who worked with the scarab beetle fauna of Oaxaca, mainly in the Sierra Sur where this species comes from.
