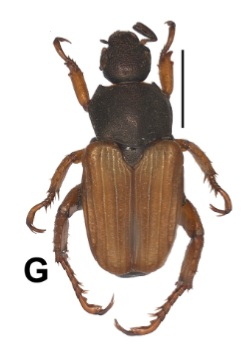

Scientific classification
- Kingdom: Animalia
- Phylum: Arthropoda
- Clade: Pancrustacea
- Class: Insecta
- Order: Coleoptera
- Suborder: Polyphaga
- Infraorder: Scarabaeiformia
- Family: Scarabaeidae
- Genus: Strigoderma
- Species: S. vulcanica

Binomial name
- Strigoderma vulcanica Andalco-Cid & Ramírez-Ponce, 2026

= Strigoderma vulcanica =

Species of beetle

Strigoderma vulcanica is a species of beetle of the family Scarabaeidae. It is found in Mexico (Colima).

== Description ==
Adults reach a length of about 6.31 mm (0.248 in). The head, pronotum and scutellum are black with coppery reflections, while the elytra, legs, scape and pedicel are intense yellow. The abdomen is dark reddish black.

== Life history ==
Feeding habits and life cycle are unknown. Specimens were collected in July and August.

== Etymology ==
The species name refers to the locality site where the type series was collected, Volcán de Colima and is derived from Latin Vulcānus (Vulcan: the Roman god of fire) and the noun suffix ica (to denote the geographic region where the species is found).
