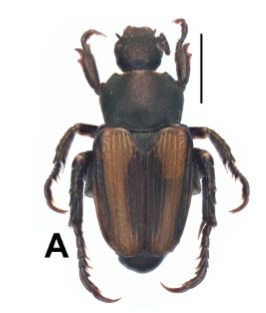

Scientific classification
- Kingdom: Animalia
- Phylum: Arthropoda
- Clade: Pancrustacea
- Class: Insecta
- Order: Coleoptera
- Suborder: Polyphaga
- Infraorder: Scarabaeiformia
- Family: Scarabaeidae
- Genus: Strigoderma
- Species: S. costulipennis

Binomial name
- Strigoderma costulipennis Bates, 1888

= Strigoderma costulipennis =

Species of beetle

Strigoderma costulipennis is a species of beetle of the family Scarabaeidae. It is found in Mexico (Guerrero), where it inhabits localities located between 500 and 1,400 meters a.s.l., characterised by scrubland and low deciduous forest.

== Description ==
Adults reach a length of about 6.81 mm (0.268 in). The head, pronotum and scutellum are black with coppery reflections. The elytra are ochre-yellow with wide dark coppery bands preceding the outer edge and contiguous to the suture. The abdomen is dark reddish black. Males may have a coppery or greenish reflection on pronotum and head.

== Life history ==
It has been collected on flowers of Acacia species. Its life cycle is unknown. Adult specimens were collected in June and July.
