= Geniatini =

Scientific classification
- Kingdom: Animalia
- Phylum: Arthropoda
- Clade: Pancrustacea
- Class: Insecta
- Order: Coleoptera
- Suborder: Polyphaga
- Infraorder: Scarabaeiformia
- Family: Scarabaeidae
- Subfamily: Rutelinae
- Tribe: Geniatini; Burmeister, 1844

Tribe of beetles

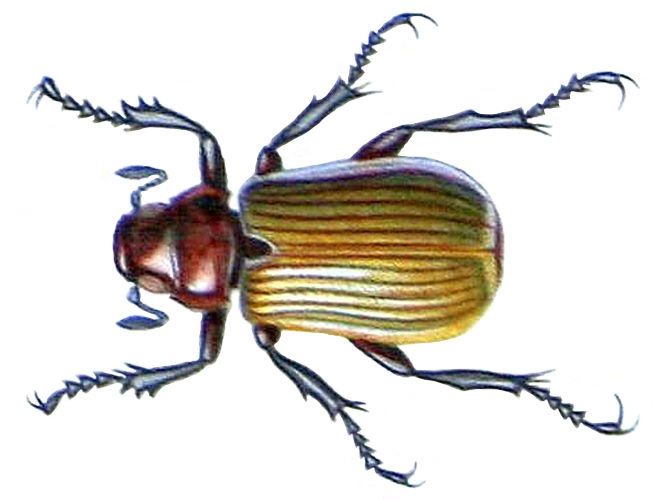
Bolax phalerata

Geniatini is a tribe of shining leaf chafers in the family Scarabaeidae. There are about 10-13 genera and at over 300 described species in Rutelini.

== Genera ==
- Bolax Fischer von Waldheim, 1829
- Eunanus Ohaus, 1909
- Evanos Laporte, 1840
- Geniates Kirby, 1808
- Geniatosoma Costa Lima, 1940
- Heterogeniates Ohaus, 1909
- Leucothyreus MacLeay, 1819
- Lobogeniates Ohaus, 1917
- Microchilus Blanchard, 1951
- Mimogeniates Martínez, 1964
- Rhizogeniates Ohaus, 1909
- Trizogeniates Ohaus, 1917
- Xenogeniates Villatoro and Jameson, 2001
