= Odochilus syntheticus =

Scientific classification
- Kingdom: Animalia
- Phylum: Arthropoda
- Clade: Pancrustacea
- Class: Insecta
- Order: Coleoptera
- Suborder: Polyphaga
- Infraorder: Scarabaeiformia
- Family: Scarabaeidae
- Genus: Odochilus
- Species: O. syntheticus

Binomial name
- Odochilus syntheticus Harold, 1877

Synonyms
- Odochilus wallacei Petrovitz, 1965

Species of beetle

Odochilus syntheticus is a species of beetle of the family Scarabaeidae. It is found in Indonesia (Sulawesi).

== Description ==
Adults reach a length of about 2.5–3.5 mm (0.098–0.138 in). They have a quite strongly convex, reddish-brown or yellowish-brown body with a grey coating. The legs are lighter yellowish-brown.
