= Odochilus convexus =

Scientific classification
- Kingdom: Animalia
- Phylum: Arthropoda
- Clade: Pancrustacea
- Class: Insecta
- Order: Coleoptera
- Suborder: Polyphaga
- Infraorder: Scarabaeiformia
- Family: Scarabaeidae
- Genus: Odochilus
- Species: O. convexus

Binomial name
- Odochilus convexus Nomura, 1971

Species of beetle

Odochilus convexus is a species of beetle of the family Scarabaeidae. It is found in Japan and Taiwan.

== Description ==
Adults reach a length of about 2.6 mm (0.10 in). They have an elongate-oval, convex, dark red-brown body, with a mosty piceous clypeus and yellowish-brown antennae.
