= Odochilus buruensis =

Scientific classification
- Kingdom: Animalia
- Phylum: Arthropoda
- Clade: Pancrustacea
- Class: Insecta
- Order: Coleoptera
- Suborder: Polyphaga
- Infraorder: Scarabaeiformia
- Family: Scarabaeidae
- Genus: Odochilus
- Species: O. buruensis

Binomial name
- Odochilus buruensis Boucomont, 1926

Species of beetle

Odochilus buruensis is a species of beetle of the family Scarabaeidae. It is found in Indonesia (the Moluccas: Buru).

== Description ==
Adults reach a length of about 3.4 mm (0.13 in). They have a strongly convex, moderately shining, brown body.
