= Odochilus bacchusi =

Scientific classification
- Kingdom: Animalia
- Phylum: Arthropoda
- Clade: Pancrustacea
- Class: Insecta
- Order: Coleoptera
- Suborder: Polyphaga
- Infraorder: Scarabaeiformia
- Family: Scarabaeidae
- Genus: Odochilus
- Species: O. bacchusi

Binomial name
- Odochilus bacchusi Rakovič, 1987

Species of beetle

Odochilus bacchusi is a species of beetle of the family Scarabaeidae. It is found in Malaysia (Sabah).

== Description ==
Adults reach a length of about 2.6–3.2 mm (0.10–0.13 in). They have an moderately convex, moderately shining, brown body.
