= Odochilus haroldi =

Scientific classification
- Kingdom: Animalia
- Phylum: Arthropoda
- Clade: Pancrustacea
- Class: Insecta
- Order: Coleoptera
- Suborder: Polyphaga
- Infraorder: Scarabaeiformia
- Family: Scarabaeidae
- Genus: Odochilus
- Species: O. haroldi

Binomial name
- Odochilus haroldi Rakovič, 1987

Species of beetle

Odochilus haroldi is a species of beetle of the family Scarabaeidae. It is found in Malaysia (Sarawak).

== Description ==
Adults reach a length of about 2.8 mm (0.11 in). They have a moderately convex, dull, brown body.
