= Bolax (beetle) =

Scientific classification
- Domain: Eukaryota
- Kingdom: Animalia
- Phylum: Arthropoda
- Class: Insecta
- Order: Coleoptera
- Suborder: Polyphaga
- Infraorder: Scarabaeiformia
- Family: Scarabaeidae
- Subfamily: Rutelinae
- Tribe: Geniatini
- Genus: Bolax; Fischer von Waldheim, 1829

Genus of beetles

Bolax is a genus of beetles in the family Scarabaeidae, containing over 50 species.

== Species ==
- Bolax albopilosa Ohaus, 1917
- Bolax andicola Burmeister, 1844
- Bolax angulata Blanchard, 1851
- Bolax annoyeri Soula, 2011
- Bolax audiberti Soula, 2011
- Bolax boliviensis Ohaus, 1898
- Bolax buckleyi Ohaus, 1931
- Bolax campicola Machatschke, 1974
- Bolax castaneicollis Burmeister, 1844
- Bolax catharinae Blanchard, 1851
- Bolax caurana Ohaus, 1931
- Bolax costipennis Ohaus, 1928
- Bolax cupreoviridis Ohaus, 1931
- Bolax disgamia Ohaus, 1917
- Bolax femorata Nonfried, 1894
- Bolax flaveola Bates, 1888
- Bolax flavolineata (Mannerheim, 1828)
- Bolax foveolata Blanchard, 1851
- Bolax gaudichaudi Blanchard, 1851
- Bolax genieri Soula, 2011
- Bolax glabripennis Ohaus, 1917
- Bolax gonzalofideli Soula, 2011
- Bolax goyana Ohaus, 1917
- Bolax hirtula Burmeister, 1844
- Bolax howdeni Soula, 2011
- Bolax incogitata Dohrn, 1883
- Bolax magna Bates, 1888
- Bolax malkini Soula, 2011
- Bolax massai Soula, 2011
- Bolax matogrossensis Ohaus, 1917
- Bolax meyeri Soula, 2011
- Bolax mutabilis Burmeister, 1844
- Bolax nigriceps Ohaus, 1917
- Bolax oberthuri Ohaus, 1903
- Bolax palliata Burmeister, 1844
- Bolax phalerata Burmeister, 1844
- Bolax piattellai Soula, 2011
- Bolax pilosipennis Ohaus, 1917
- Bolax pulla (Latreille, 1833)
- Bolax robackeri Soula, 2011
- Bolax rutila Erichson, 1847
- Bolax salticola Ohaus, 1908
- Bolax saucia Ohaus, 1917
- Bolax sculpticollis Frey, 1976
- Bolax sprecheri Soula, 2011
- Bolax squamulifera Blanchard, 1851
- Bolax sulcicollis (Germar, 1823)
- Bolax sulcipennis Ohaus, 1928
- Bolax tacoaraphaga Ohaus, 1908
- Bolax tibialis Blanchard, 1851
- Bolax variolosa Ohaus, 1917
- Bolax vauriae Frey, 1976
- Bolax vittipennis Laporte, 1840
- Bolax zoubkovi (Fischer Von Waldheim, 1829)
