= Microchilus (beetle) =

Scientific classification
- Kingdom: Animalia
- Phylum: Arthropoda
- Class: Insecta
- Order: Coleoptera
- Suborder: Polyphaga
- Infraorder: Scarabaeiformia
- Family: Scarabaeidae
- Subfamily: Rutelinae
- Tribe: Geniatini
- Genus: Microchilus; Blanchard, 1851

Genus of beetles

Microchilus is a genus of beetles in the family Scarabaeidae.

== Species ==
The genus contains around 2 species.

- Microchilus lineatus Blanchard, 1851
- Microchilus rodmani Jameson, 2008
