= Odochilus johnsoni =

Scientific classification
- Kingdom: Animalia
- Phylum: Arthropoda
- Clade: Pancrustacea
- Class: Insecta
- Order: Coleoptera
- Suborder: Polyphaga
- Infraorder: Scarabaeiformia
- Family: Scarabaeidae
- Genus: Odochilus
- Species: O. johnsoni

Binomial name
- Odochilus johnsoni Rakovič, 1987

Species of beetle

Odochilus johnsoni is a species of beetle of the family Scarabaeidae. It is found in the Philippines (Mindoro, Palawan, Leyte).

== Description ==
Adults reach a length of about 3–3.6 mm (0.12–0.14 in). They have a moderately convex, moderately shining, dark brown body.
