= Odochilus =

Scientific classification
- Kingdom: Animalia
- Phylum: Arthropoda
- Clade: Pancrustacea
- Class: Insecta
- Order: Coleoptera
- Suborder: Polyphaga
- Infraorder: Scarabaeiformia
- Family: Scarabaeidae
- Tribe: Odochilini; Rakovič, 1987
- Genus: Odochilus; Harold, 1877

Subgenera
- Odochilus Harold, 1877; Parodochilus Rakovič, 1997

Genus of beetles

Odochilus is a genus of scarab beetles in the family Scarabaeidae, the sole genus of the tribe Odochilini. There are more than 20 described species in Odochilus, found in east and southeast Asia.

== Species ==
These 23 species belong to the genus Odochilus:

- Subgenus Odochilus
  - Odochilus haroldi Rakovič, 1987
  - Odochilus johnsoni Rakovič, 1987
  - Odochilus laotianus Minkina, 2020
  - Odochilus parajohnsoni Rakovič, 1997
  - Odochilus parasetosus Rakovič, 1997
  - Odochilus parasyntheticus Rakovič, 1997
  - Odochilus philippinensis Rakovič, 1987
  - Odochilus setosus Boucomont, 1914
  - Odochilus sulawesiensis Minkina, Bezdĕk & Král, 2023
  - Odochilus syntheticus Harold, 1877
  - Odochilus taiwanus Masumoto, Lan & Kiuchi, 2016
- Subgenus Parodochilus Rakovič, 1997
  - Odochilus bacchusi Rakovič, 1987
  - Odochilus balthasari Rakovič, 1987
  - Odochilus borneensis Rakovič & Anichtchenko, 2021
  - Odochilus buruensis Boucomont, 1926
  - Odochilus convexus Nomura, 1971
  - Odochilus jani Bezděk & Krivan, 2001
  - Odochilus kashizakii Ochi, Kon & Kawahara, 2017
  - Odochilus montanus Masumoto & Kiuchi, 2019
  - Odochilus pittinoi Rakovič, 1987
  - Odochilus sarawakensis Rakovič, 1997
  - Odochilus shavrini Rakovič & Anichtchenko, 2021
  - Odochilus siberutensis Minkina & Jákl, 2023
  - Odochilus thailandicus Rakovič, 1997
