= Odochilus setosus =

Scientific classification
- Kingdom: Animalia
- Phylum: Arthropoda
- Clade: Pancrustacea
- Class: Insecta
- Order: Coleoptera
- Suborder: Polyphaga
- Infraorder: Scarabaeiformia
- Family: Scarabaeidae
- Genus: Odochilus
- Species: O. setosus

Binomial name
- Odochilus setosus Boucomont, 1914

Synonyms
- Odochilus grabowskyi Petrovitz, 1965

Species of beetle

Odochilus setosus is a species of beetle of the family Scarabaeidae. It is found in Indonesia (Kalimantan).

== Description ==
Adults reach a length of about 3.1–3.4 mm (0.12–0.13 in). They have a moderately convex, subparallel, dull, brown body.
