= Odochilus balthasari =

Scientific classification
- Kingdom: Animalia
- Phylum: Arthropoda
- Clade: Pancrustacea
- Class: Insecta
- Order: Coleoptera
- Suborder: Polyphaga
- Infraorder: Scarabaeiformia
- Family: Scarabaeidae
- Genus: Odochilus
- Species: O. balthasari

Binomial name
- Odochilus balthasari Rakovič, 1987

Species of beetle

Odochilus balthasari is a species of beetle of the family Scarabaeidae. It is found in Indonesia (Sumatra, Java) and Malaysia.

== Description ==
Adults reach a length of about 2.9–3.6 mm (0.11–0.14 in). They have a moderately convex, subparallel, dull, brown body.
