= Odochilus pittinoi =

Scientific classification
- Kingdom: Animalia
- Phylum: Arthropoda
- Clade: Pancrustacea
- Class: Insecta
- Order: Coleoptera
- Suborder: Polyphaga
- Infraorder: Scarabaeiformia
- Family: Scarabaeidae
- Genus: Odochilus
- Species: O. pittinoi

Binomial name
- Odochilus pittinoi Rakovič, 1987

Species of beetle

Odochilus pittinoi is a species of beetle of the family Scarabaeidae. It is found in Indonesia (Sulawesi).

== Description ==
Adults reach a length of about 3–3.4 mm (0.12–0.13 in). They have an moderately shining body.
