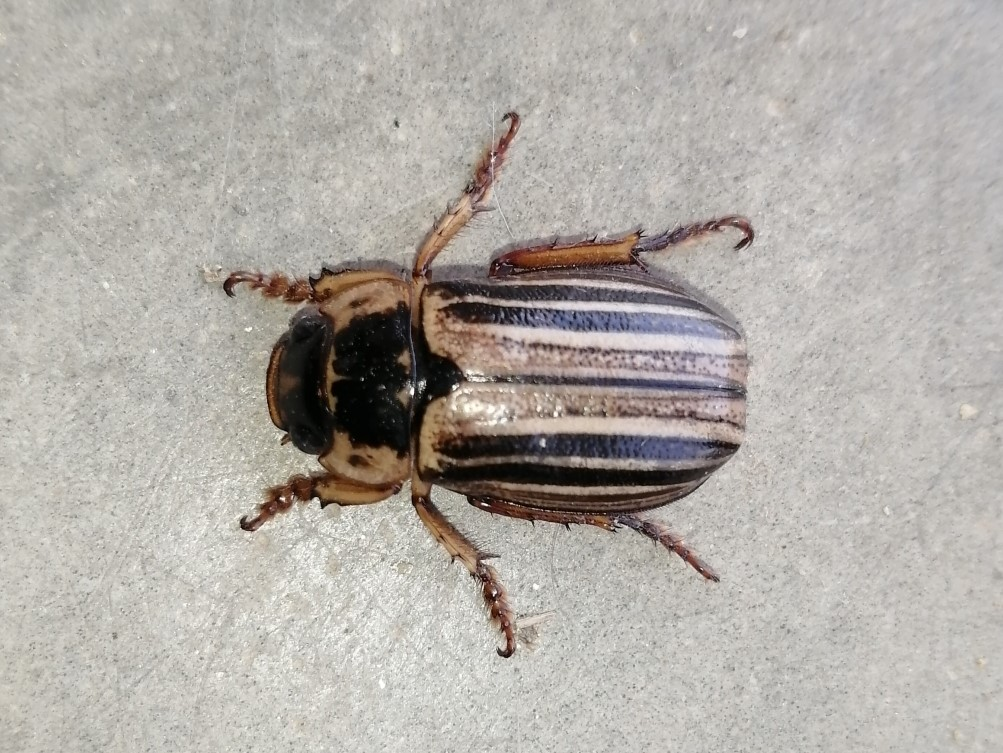
- Trizogeniates foveicollis

Scientific classification
- Kingdom: Animalia
- Phylum: Arthropoda
- Class: Insecta
- Order: Coleoptera
- Suborder: Polyphaga
- Infraorder: Scarabaeiformia
- Family: Scarabaeidae
- Subfamily: Rutelinae
- Genus: Trizogeniates; Ohaus, 1917

= Trizogeniates =

Genus of beetles

Trizogeniates is a genus of beetles in the family Scarabaeidae.

== Species ==
- Trizogeniates beckeri Ferriera, Bravo, Grossi & Seidel, 2019
- Trizogeniates cribricollis (Lucas, 1859)
- Trizogeniates curvatus Ferriera, Bravo, Grossi & Seidel, 2019
- Trizogeniates dispar (Burmeister, 1844)
- Trizogeniates eliskae Ferriera, Bravo, Grossi & Seidel, 2019
- Trizogeniates eris
- Trizogeniates goyanus Ohaus, 1917
- Trizogeniates hallensorum Ferriera, Bravo, Grossi & Seidel, 2019
- Trizogeniates laevis (Camerano, 1878)
- Trizogeniates montanus Ohaus, 1917
- Trizogeniates spatulatus Ferriera, Bravo, Grossi & Seidel, 2019
- Trizogeniates temporalis Ohaus, 1917
- Trizogeniates terricolus Ohaus, 1917
- Trizogeniates vazdemelloi Ferriera, Bravo, Grossi & Seidel, 2019
- Trizogeniates vittatus (Lucas, 1859)
- Trizogeniates zuzanae Ferriera, Bravo, Grossi & Seidel, 2019
