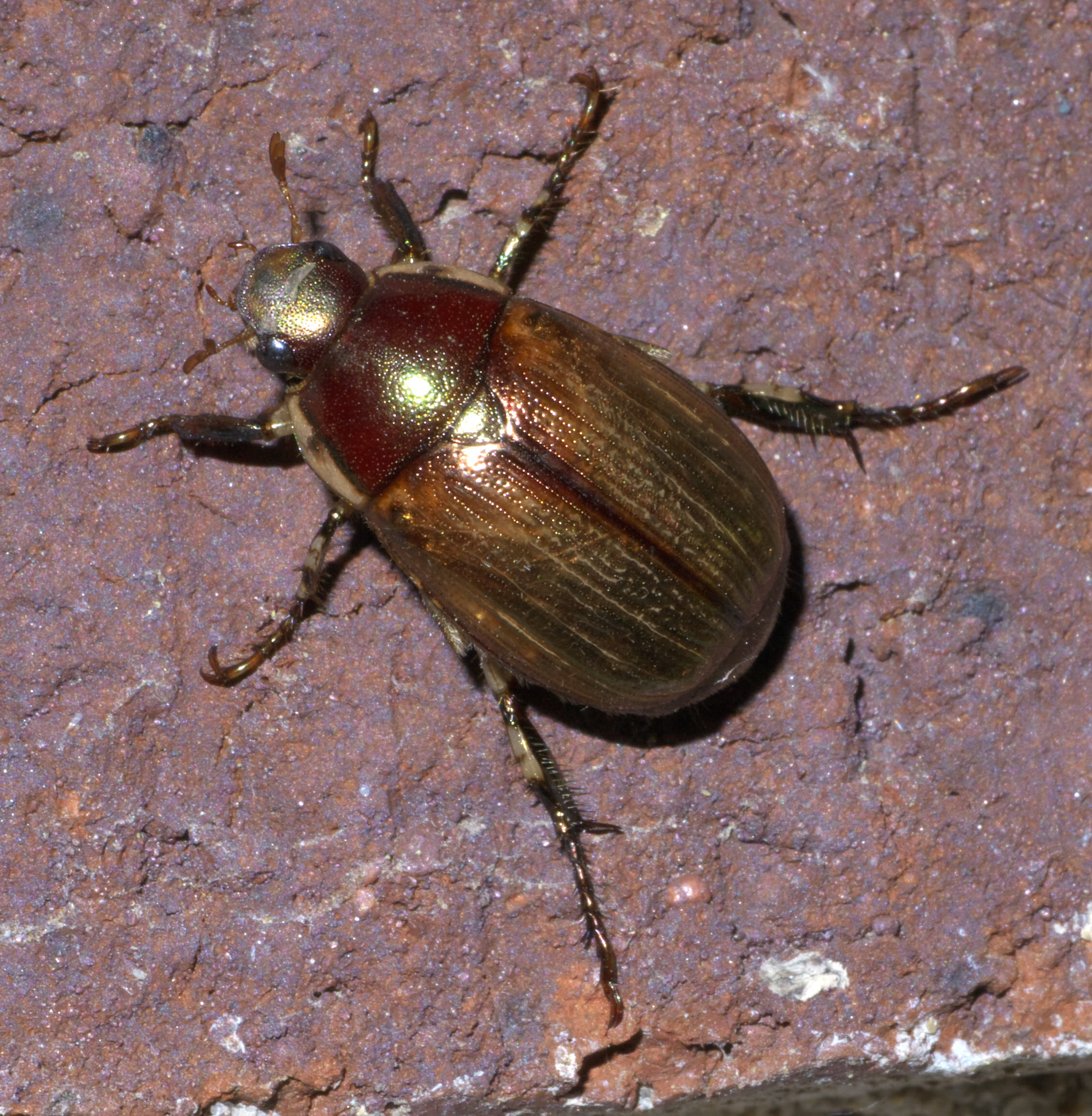
- Callistethus marginatus

Scientific classification
- Kingdom: Animalia
- Phylum: Arthropoda
- Class: Insecta
- Order: Coleoptera
- Suborder: Polyphaga
- Infraorder: Scarabaeiformia
- Family: Scarabaeidae
- Subfamily: Rutelinae
- Tribe: Anomalini
- Genus: Callistethus; Blanchard, 1851

Diversity
- at least 130 species

= Callistethus =

Genus of beetles

Callistethus is a genus of shining leaf chafers in the beetle family Scarabaeidae. There are at least 130 described species in Callistethus.

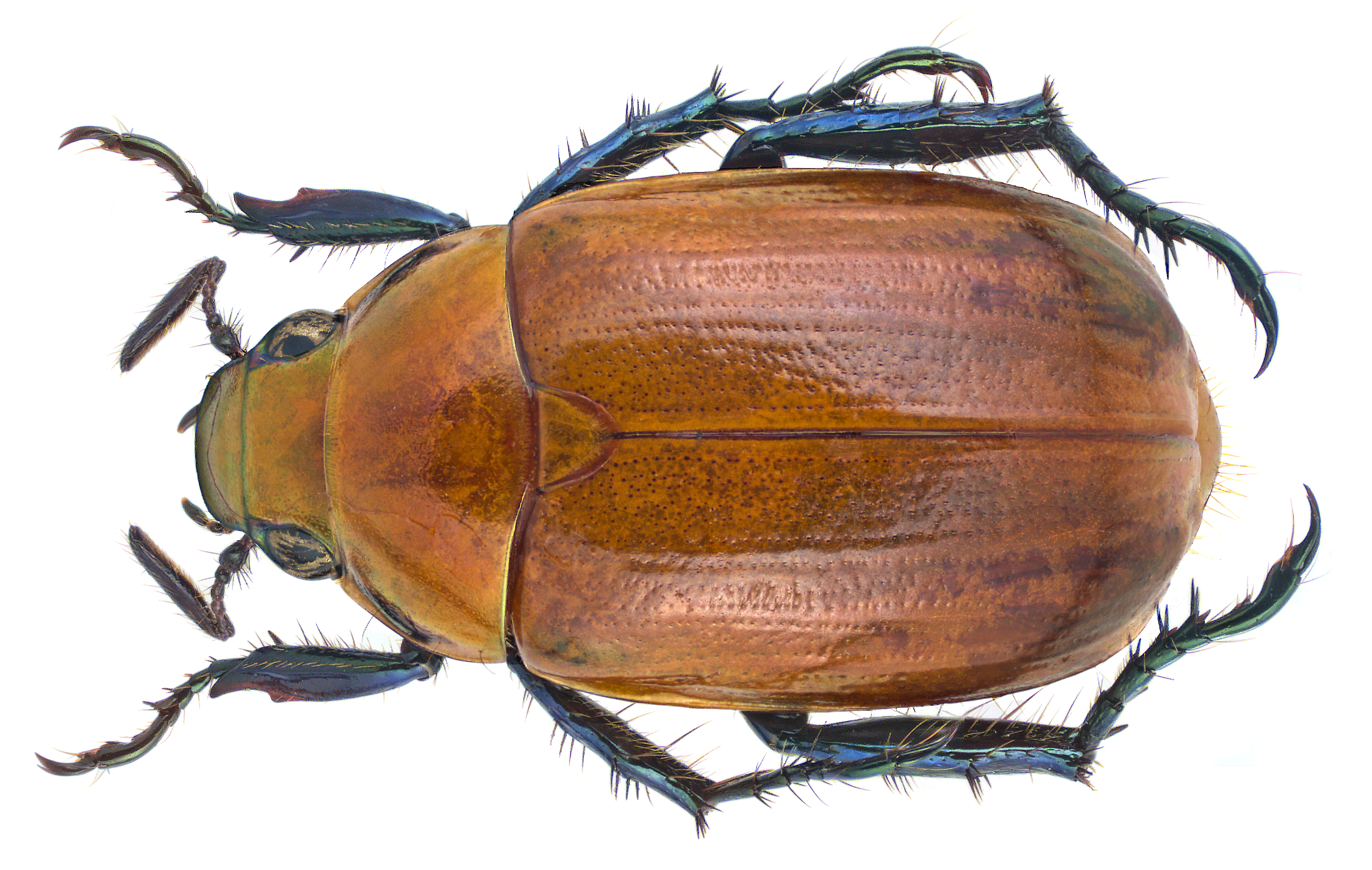
Callistethus plagiicollis

== See also ==
- List of Callistethus species
