= List of Callistethus species =

These 130 species belong to Callistethus, a genus of shining leaf chafers in the family Scarabaeidae.

== Callistethus species ==
- Callistethus aegrus (Ohaus, 1916)
- Callistethus agnellus (Arrow, 1911)
- Callistethus amphilissus (Arrow, 1917)
- Callistethus andoi Wada, 2015
- Callistethus anwari (Abdullah & Roohi, 1969)
- Callistethus armatus (Arrow, 1911)
- Callistethus ashrafii (Abdullah & Roohi, 1968)
- Callistethus auronitens (Hope, 1835)
- Callistethus benicolus (Ohaus, 1897)
- Callistethus buchwaldianus (Ohaus, 1908)
- Callistethus buddahnus Miyake, 1989
- Callistethus bugnioni (Gillet, 1924)
- Callistethus burmeisteri (Lansberge, 1879)
- Callistethus callewaerti (Ohaus, 1914)
- Callistethus calonotus (Bates, 1888)
- Callistethus carbo Filippini, Galante & Micó, 2015
- Callistethus catoptricus (Ohaus, 1916)
- Callistethus chalcosomus (Blanchard, 1850)
- Callistethus chloromelus (Arrow, 1911)
- Callistethus chlorotoides (Bates, 1888)
- Callistethus chontalensis (Bates, 1888)
- Callistethus chrysanthe (Bates, 1888)
- Callistethus chrysomelinus (Bates, 1888)
- Callistethus coeruleus (Ohaus, 1908)
- Callistethus cupricollis
- Callistethus curtisi (Waterhouse, 1881)
- Callistethus daruma Wada, 2000
- Callistethus dechambrei Wada, 1998
- Callistethus degeneratus (Arrow, 1911)
- Callistethus ebenus (Burmeister, 1855)
- Callistethus epicholicus (Ohaus, 1914)
- Callistethus excellens (Nonfried, 1894)
- Callistethus excisipennis Linnaeus, 1981
- Callistethus flavodorsalis Filippini, Galante & Micó, 2015
- Callistethus formosanus Kobayashi, 1987
- Callistethus fusciventris (Ohaus, 1926)
- Callistethus fuscorubens Filippini, Galante & Micó, 2015
- Callistethus fuscus Wada, 1998
- Callistethus gemmulus (Arrow, 1911)
- Callistethus glandulicollis Ohaus, 1914
- Callistethus granulipygus (Bates, 1888)
- Callistethus hauschildti (Ohaus, 1903)
- Callistethus hiekei (Frey, 1968)
- Callistethus insignis (Lansberge, 1880)
- Callistethus irrorellus (Castelnau, 1840)
- Callistethus isolatus (Arrow, 1917)
- Callistethus keili (Ritsema, 1893)
- Callistethus ladino (Ohaus, 1902)
- Callistethus laevigatus
- Callistethus lativittis Filippini, Galante & Micó, 2015
- Callistethus lepidus (Burmeister, 1844)
- Callistethus levigatus Filippini, Galante & Micó, 2015
- Callistethus levii (Blanchard, 1850)
- Callistethus lubricus (Ohaus, 1915)
- Callistethus macroxantholeus Filippini, Galante & Micó, 2015
- Callistethus maculatus (Guérin-Méneville, 1834)
- Callistethus madurae (Arrow, 1911)
- Callistethus magnificus Wada, 1998
- Callistethus malayus (Ohaus, 1932)
- Callistethus marginatus (Fabricius, 1792)
- Callistethus marginicollis
- Callistethus masayukii Wada, 2000
- Callistethus metallicus (Benderitter, 1923)
- Callistethus microxantholeus Filippini, Galante & Micó, 2015
- Callistethus mimeloides (Ohaus, 1902)
- Callistethus mindanaoensis Wada, 2002
- Callistethus mojo (Ohaus, 1897)
- Callistethus morio (Ohaus, 1913)
- Callistethus multiplicatus Filippini, Galante & Micó, 2015
- Callistethus myanmarensis Fujioka & Kobayashi, 2012
- Callistethus nakanei Wada, 1998
- Callistethus naponensis (Ohaus, 1897)
- Callistethus nicoya (Ohaus, 1928)
- Callistethus nuptus (Ohaus, 1905)
- Callistethus oculicollis (Arrow, 1911)
- Callistethus palawanensis Wada, 1998
- Callistethus parapulcher Filippini, Galante & Micó, 2015
- Callistethus parvus (Arrow, 1917)
- Callistethus picturatus (Candèze, 1869)
- Callistethus plagiicollis
- Callistethus porcatus (Blanchard, 1850)
- Callistethus princeps (Kraatz, 1892)
- Callistethus pseudocollaris Filippini, Galante & Micó, 2015
- Callistethus pseudolepidus Morón & Nogueira, 2002
- Callistethus pterygophorus Ohaus, 1903
- Callistethus pulchra (Blanchard, 1850)
- Callistethus puncticollis (Kirsch, 1885)
- Callistethus pyritosus (Erichson, 1847)
- Callistethus pyropus (Nonfried, 1890)
- Callistethus pyropygus (Nonfried, 1891)
- Callistethus pyroscelis (Hope, 1841)
- Callistethus qaudrii (Abdullah & Roohi, 1968)
- Callistethus rachelae (Arrow, 1917)
- Callistethus regina (Newman, 1838)
- Callistethus riedeli (Lansberge, 1880)
- Callistethus rosenbergi (Ohaus, 1902)
- Callistethus rufomicans (Ohaus, 1897)
- Callistethus rugilaterus (Arrow, 1911)
- Callistethus ruteloides Filippini, Galante & Micó, 2015
- Callistethus shafqati (Abdullah & Roohi, 1968)
- Callistethus similis Wada, 1998
- Callistethus somai Wada, 2002
- Callistethus spiniferus (Ohaus, 1915)
- Callistethus stannibractea Filippini, Galante & Micó, 2015
- Callistethus stoliczkae (Sharp, 1878)
- Callistethus stolidopygus (Ohaus, 1915)
- Callistethus strigatus (Castelnau, 1840)
- Callistethus strigidiodes (Blanchard, 1850)
- Callistethus sulawesiensis Wada, 1999
- Callistethus sulcans (Bates, 1888)
- Callistethus sulcipennis (Castelnau, 1840)
- Callistethus suratus (Burmeister, 1844)
- Callistethus tigrinus (Nonfried, 1906)
- Callistethus tlapanecus Ramírez-Ponce & Morón, 2012
- Callistethus tondanoensis Wada, 2002
- Callistethus tricostulatus (Ohaus, 1897)
- Callistethus trivittatus (Perty, 1831)
- Callistethus tumidicauda (Arrow, 1912)
- Callistethus valdecostatus (Bates, 1888)
- Callistethus vanpatteni (Bates, 1888)
- Callistethus varius (Newman, 1839)
- Callistethus vietnamensis Fujioka & Kobayashi, 2012
- Callistethus viridiflava (Ohaus, 1925)
- Callistethus vitricus Fujioka & Kobayashi, 2012
- Callistethus wallandi (Candèze, 1869)
- Callistethus xantholeus (Bates, 1888)
- Callistethus xanthonotus (Arrow, 1917)
- Callistethus xiphostethus (Bates, 1888)
- Callistethus yalizo Filippini, Galante & Micó, 2015
- Callistethus yunusi (Abdullah & Roohi, 1969)
