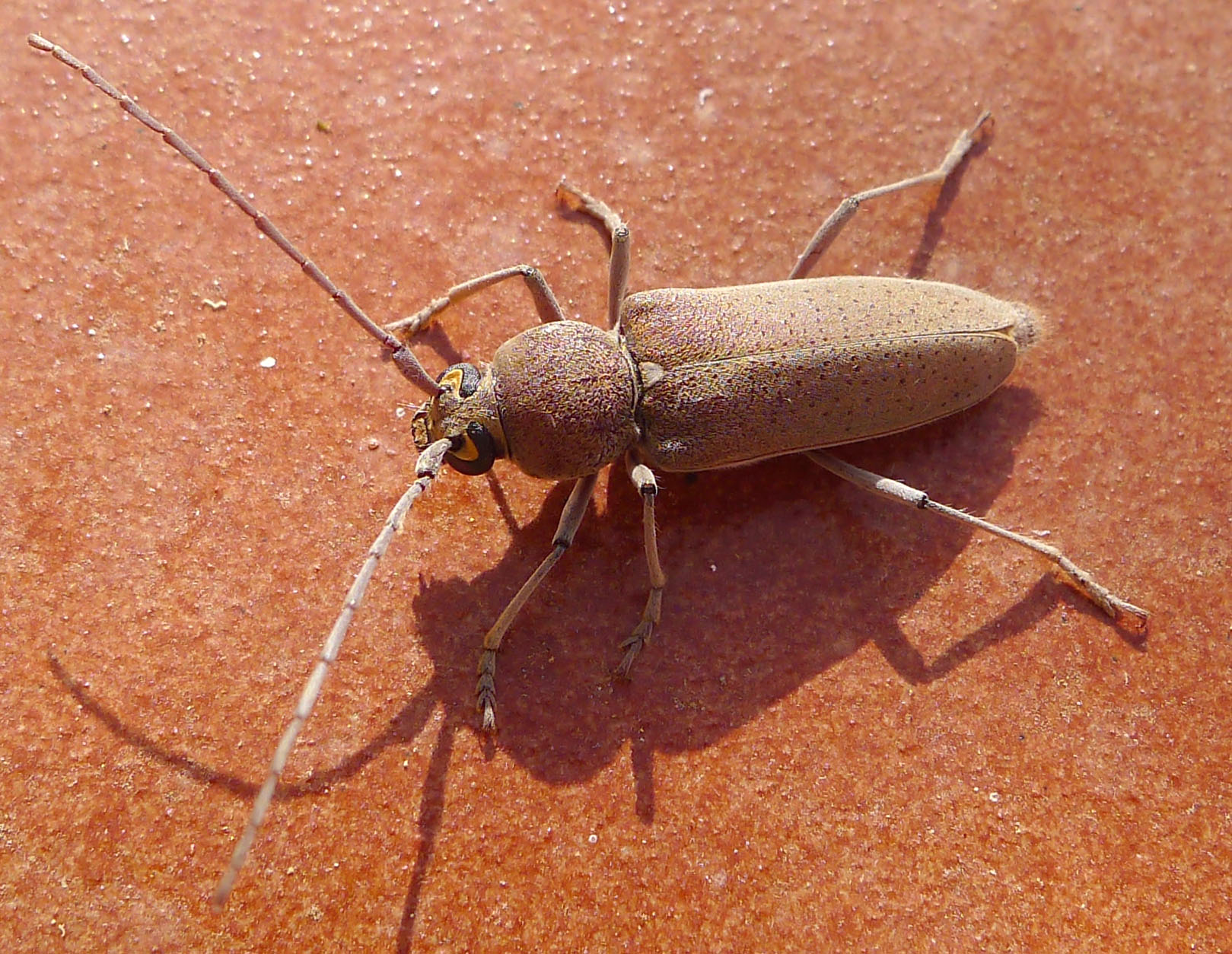
- Hesperophanes sericeus

Scientific classification
- Kingdom: Animalia
- Phylum: Arthropoda
- Clade: Pancrustacea
- Class: Insecta
- Order: Coleoptera
- Suborder: Polyphaga
- Infraorder: Cucujiformia
- Family: Cerambycidae
- Subfamily: Cerambycinae
- Tribe: Hesperophanini; Mulsant, 1839

= Hesperophanini =

Tribe of beetles

Hesperophanini is a tribe of beetles in the subfamily Cerambycinae; it was erected by Étienne Mulsant in 1839.

== Genera ==
BioLib includes:

1. Aesiotyche Pascoe, 1865
2. Africophanes Sama, 1991
3. Aganipus Fairmaire, 1893
4. Alastos Napp & Martins, 1982
5. Anatinomma Bates, 1892
6. Anoplomerus Guérin-Méneville, 1844
7. Aphoplistus Murray, 1870
8. Aspitus Kolbe, 1893
9. Austranoplium Chemsak & Linsley, 1963
10. Austrophanes Chemsak & Linsley, 1963
11. Blabinotus Wollaston, 1854
12. Brittonella Fisher, 1932
13. Brothylus LeConte, 1859
14. Cacophrissus Bates, 1885
15. Catoptronotum Zajciw, 1959
16. Cerasphorus Audinet-Serville, 1834
17. Cetimaique Martins & Galileo, 1999
18. Cidugala Aurivillius, 1908
19. Corupella Martins & Napp, 2007
20. Crinarnoldius Lepesme & Breuning, 1956
21. Cristaphanes Vives, 2009
22. †Delostromatium Zhang, 1989
23. Dubiefostola Tavakilian & Monné, 1991
24. Eburiomorpha Fisher, 1935
25. Eucrossus LeConte, 1873
26. Eusapia Gounelle, 1909
27. Garissa Quentin & Villiers, 1979
28. Garnierius Adlbauer, 2001
29. Gastrophacodes Lea, 1916
30. Gnatholea Thomson, 1860
31. Gnatholeophanes Kolbe, 1900
32. Grammicosum Blanchard in Orbigny, 1843
33. Haplidus LeConte, 1873
34. Hesperanoplium Linsley, 1957
35. Hespereburia Tavakilian & Monné, 1991
36. Hesperoferus Demelt, 1971
37. Hesperophanes Dejean, 1835
38. Hesperophanoschema Zajciw, 1970
39. Hesperophymatus Zajciw, 1959
40. Heteraneflus Chemsak & Linsley, 1963
41. Hololeprus Gerstäcker, 1884
42. Icosium Lucas, 1854
43. Liogramma Bates, 1874
44. Liosteburia Tavakilian & Monné, 1991
45. Liostola Zajciw, 1962
46. Makromastax Santos-Silva, Botero & Le Tirant, 2018
47. Malcho Mondaca & Beéche, 2022
48. Malobidion Schaeffer, 1908
49. Meganoplium Linsley, 1940
50. Megosmidus Hovore, 1988
51. Nesophanes Chemsak, 1967
52. Ochrocydus Pascoe, 1876
53. Ochrus Lacordaire, 1869
54. Oebarina Pascoe, 1866
55. Oemophanes Adlbauer, 2001
56. Oraphanes Chemsak & Linsley, 1984
57. Osmidus LeConte, 1873
58. Paracorupella Martins & Galileo, 2009
59. Paracrinarnoldius Bjørnstad, 2017
60. Paraliostola Tavakilian & Monné, 1991
61. Parandraceps Giesbert, 1998
62. Paraphacodes Belon, 1902
63. Perilasius Bates, 1880
64. Phacodes Newman, 1840
65. Phrynocris Bates, 1867
66. Phymatioderus Blanchard in Orbigny, 1843
67. Piezosecus Martins & Galileo, 2003
68. Potiaete Martins & Galileo, 1999
69. Rusapeana Adlbauer, 1995
70. Sotira Pascoe, 1885
71. Stromatiodes J. Thomson, 1878
72. Stromatium Audinet-Serville, 1834
73. Swaziphanes Adlbauer, 2002
74. Tanzaniphanes Adlbauer, 2007
75. Teinotus Brancsik, 1897
76. Tetropiopsis Chobaut, 1899
77. Thecladoris Gounelle, 1909
78. Tippmannia Monné, 2006
79. Tomentophanes Adlbauer, 2004
80. Trachelophanes Murray, 1870
81. Trichoferus Wollaston, 1854
82. Tropicophanes Sama, 1991
83. Turcmenigena: monotypic Turcmenigena varentzovi Melgunov, 1894
84. Tylonotus Haldeman, 1847
85. Vilchesia Cerda, 1980
86. Xeranoplium Linsley, 1957
87. Xuthodes Pascoe, 1875
88. Zambiphanes Adlbauer, 2009
89. Zamium Pascoe, 1864
90. Zamodes LeConte, 1873 (presumed extinct)
91. Zathecus Bates, 1867
92. Zoodes Pascoe, 1867
93. Zygoferus Sama, 2008
