= S. chilense =

S. chilense may refer to:

- Solanum chilense, plant species from the subgenus Lycopersicon
- Symphyotrichum chilense, species of flowering plant in the family Asteraceae
- Stromatium chilense, species of beetle in the family Cerambycidae
