= Nathaniel Lord Britton =

American botanist, taxonomist (1859–1934)

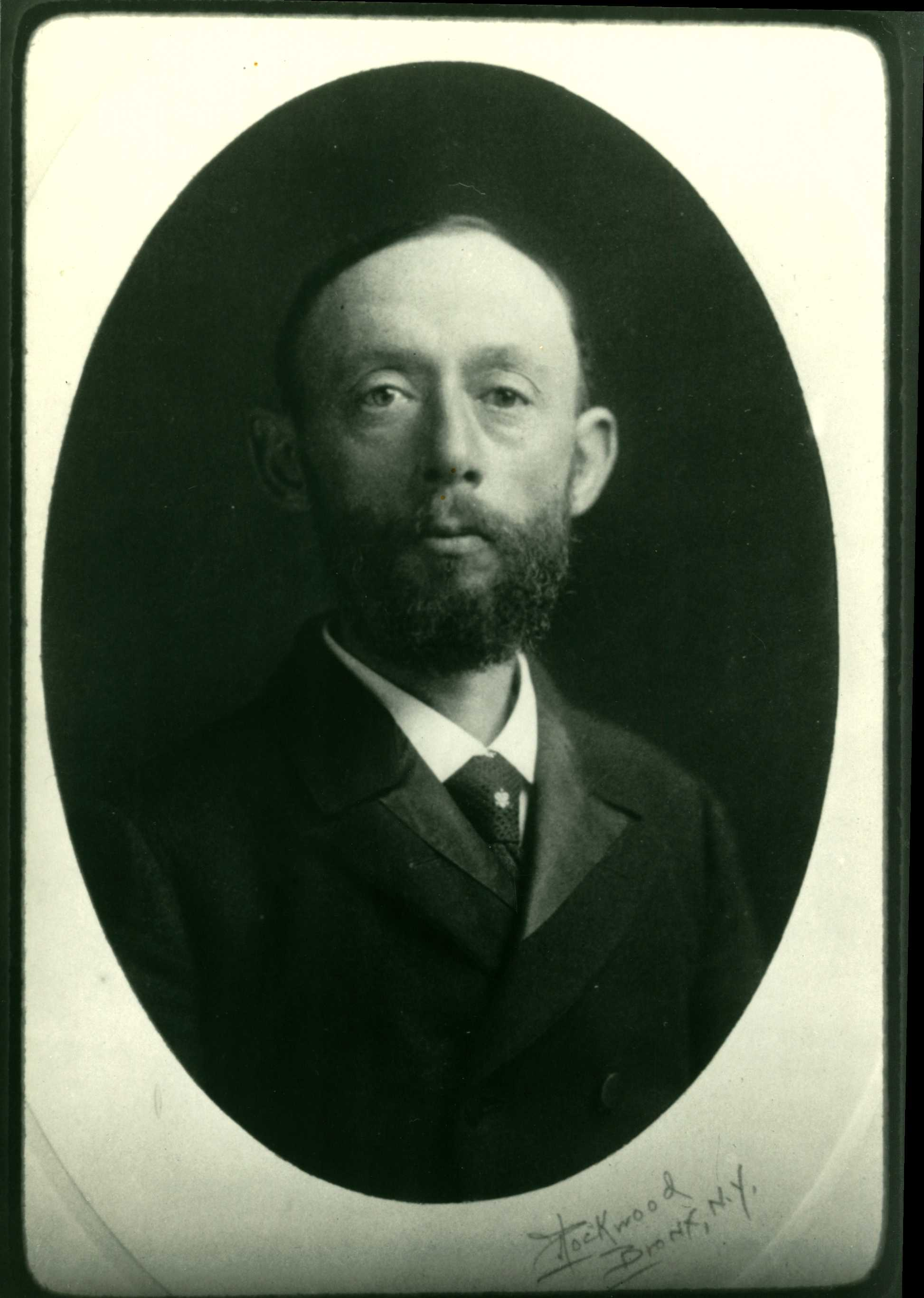
- Born: January 15, 1859; Staten Island, New York
- Died: June 25, 1934 (aged 75); Bronx, New York
- Education: Columbia University School of Mines
- Known for: Illustrated Flora of the Northern United States, Canada, and the British Possessions, with Addison Brown; The Cactaceae, with Joseph Nelson Rose
- Spouse: Elizabeth Gertrude Knight
- Scientific career
- Fields: Botany
- Institutions: Columbia University, New York Botanical Garden
- Author abbrev. (botany): Britton

Nathaniel Lord Britton (1859 – 1934) was an American botanist and taxonomist who co-founded the New York Botanical Garden in the Bronx, New York.

== Early life ==
Britton was born on the 15 of January 1859 at New Dorp, Richmond County, New York (state) to Jasper Alexander Hamilton Britton and Harriet Lord Turner. His parents wanted him to study religion, but he was attracted to nature study at an early age.

He was a graduate of the Columbia University School of Mines and afterwards taught geology and botany at Columbia University. He joined the Torrey Botanical Club soon after graduation and was a member his entire life. Britton was an elected member of the United States National Academy of Sciences, the American Academy of Arts and Sciences, and the American Philosophical Society. He married Elizabeth Gertrude Knight, a bryologist, on August 27, 1885. They had met when she joined the club and were lifelong collaborators in botanical research.

== New York Botanical Garden ==
During their honeymoon in 1888, they visited Kew Gardens, which led to his wife proposing a botanical garden for New York at a Torrey Club meeting. Together, they campaigned to bring about the NYBG. Britton left Columbia in 1895 to become the first director of the New York Botanical Garden, a position he held until 1929. He was on the first Board of Managers for the institution, along with Andrew Carnegie, J. Pierpont Morgan, and Cornelius Vanderbilt II. He engendered substantial financial support for the botanical garden by naming plants after wealthy contributors.

== Scientific research ==
Much of his field work was done in the Caribbean, where he visited frequently when the winter weather in New York City became too severe. His contributions to the study of Caribbean flora are undisputed.

He wrote Illustrated Flora of the Northern United States, Canada, and the British Possessions (1896) with Addison Brown, and The Cactaceae with Joseph Nelson Rose.

Britton is also remembered as one of the signatories of the American Code of Botanical Nomenclature that proposed such radical changes to the rules governing nomenclature that a compromise was not reached (and some of the principal American provisions adopted) until nearly 30 years later.

== Death and legacy ==
He died at his home in the Bronx on June 25, 1934, after suffering a stroke 9 weeks earlier.

The house he lived and worked in, the Britton Cottage, is preserved at Historic Richmond Town on Staten Island.

The genera Brittonastrum (now a synonym of Agastache Clayton ex Gronov.), Brittonella (a synonym of Mionandra Griseb.), Brittonamra (which is now a synonym of Coursetia DC.), Brittonia (synonym of Ferocactus Britton & Rose), and Brittonrosea (a synonym of Echinocactus Link & Otto) and also Neobrittonia, as well as the botanical journal Brittonia are all named after him.

== Works ==
John Hendley Barnhart contributed a bibliography of all of Britton's works to Biographical memoir of Nathaniel Lord Britton, 1859-1934 authored by Elmer Drew Merrill and presented to the National Academy of Sciences at the annual meeting, 1938. In 1960, Henry A. Gleason published The scientific work of Nathanial Lord Britton, where he summarized and provided commentary on Britton's early botanical activities, botanical organizations, his nomenclatural work, the Illustrated Flora, his leadership of the New York Botanical Garden, his West Indian Flora, his North America Flora, his Flora of Northern South America, his North American Trees, and his monographic work.

- Britton, Nathaniel; Addison Brown (1896). An illustrated flora of the northern United States, Canada and the British Possessions From Newfoundland to the Parallel of the Southern Boundary of Virginia, and from the Atlantic Ocean Westward to the 102d Meridian. Volume I, Ophioglossaceae to Aizoaceae. Charles Scribner's Sons. pp. 612.
- Britton, Nathaniel; Addison Brown (1898). An illustrated flora of the northern United States, Canada and the British Possessions From Newfoundland to the Parallel of the Southern Boundary of Virginia, and from the Atlantic Ocean Westward to the 102d Meridian. Volume III, Apocynacea to Compositae; Dogbane to Thistle. Charles Scribner's Sons. p. 643 pages.
- Britton, Nathaniel; Addison Brown (1913). An illustrated flora of the northern United States, Canada and the British Possessions From Newfoundland to the Parallel of the Southern Boundary of Virginia, and from the Atlantic Ocean Westward to the 102d Meridian. Volume II, Amaranthaceae to Loganiaceae. Charles Scribner's Sons. p. 2052 pages.
- Britton, Nathaniel Lord; Addison Brown (1913). An Illustrated Flora of the Northern United States, Canada and the British Possessions From Newfoundland to the Parallel of the Southern Boundary of Virginia, and from the Atlantic Ocean Westward to the 102d Meridian. Volume III Gentianaceae to Compositae -- Gentian to Thistle (Second Edition -- Revised and Enlarged ed.). New York: Charles Scribner's Sons.
- Britton, Nathaniel; Joseph Nelson Rose (1922). The Cactaceae: Descriptions and Illustrations of Plants of the Cactus Family. Carnegie Institution for Science. p. 263 pages.
- A preliminary catalogue of the flora of New Jersey (1881) Et al.
- An illustrated flora of the northern United States, Canada and the British possessions from Newfoundland to the parallel of the southern boundary of Virginia, and from the Atlantic ocean westward to the 102d meridian 3 volumes. (1896–98) With Addison Brown.
- Contributions to the botany of the Yukon Territory (1901) Et al.
- Manual of the flora of the northern states and Canada (1901)
- The sedges of Jamaica (1907)
- Studies in West Indian plants (1908–26)
- Rhipsalis in the West Indies (1909)
- An illustrated flora of the northern United States, Canada and the British possessions (Vol. 1–3, 1913) With Addison Brown.
- The vegetation of Mona Island (1915)
- Flora of Bermuda (1918)
- The flora of the American Virgin Islands (1918)
- Descriptions of Cuban plants new to science (1920)
- The Bahama flora (1920) With Charles Frederick Millspaugh.
- Neoabbottia, a new cactus genus from Hispaniola (1921)
- The Cactaceae (1919 - 1923) online
- With Henry Hurd Rusby he issued the exsiccata Plantae Bolivianae a Miguel Bang lectae.
