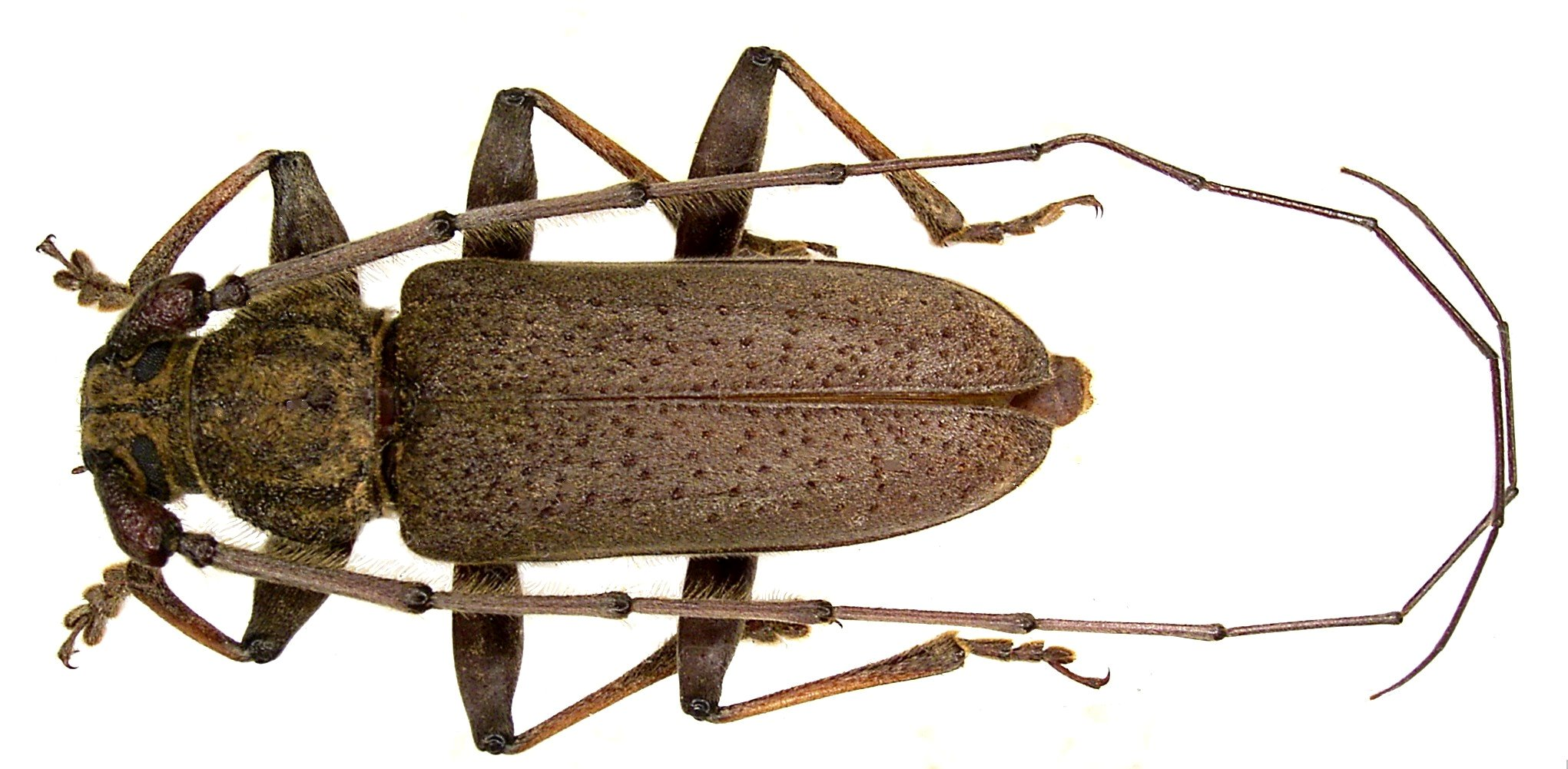
- Stromatium longicorne

Scientific classification
- Domain: Eukaryota
- Kingdom: Animalia
- Phylum: Arthropoda
- Class: Insecta
- Order: Coleoptera
- Suborder: Polyphaga
- Infraorder: Cucujiformia
- Family: Cerambycidae
- Subfamily: Cerambycinae
- Tribe: Hesperophanini
- Genus: Stromatium; Audinet-Serville, 1834

Synonyms
- Solenophorus Mulsant, 1839

= Stromatium =

Genus of beetles

Stromatium is a genus of beetles in the family Cerambycidae, containing the following species:

- Stromatium alienum Pascoe, 1857
- Stromatium barbatum (Fabricius, 1775)
- Stromatium chilense Cerda, 1968
- Stromatium darwinense Jin et al., 2019
- Stromatium fulvum (Villers, 1789) (= auratum (Böber, 1793), unicolor Olivier, 1795)
- Stromatium longicorne (Newman, 1842)
