= Ochrus tippmanni =

Scientific classification
- Domain: Eukaryota
- Kingdom: Animalia
- Phylum: Arthropoda
- Class: Insecta
- Order: Coleoptera
- Suborder: Polyphaga
- Infraorder: Cucujiformia
- Family: Cerambycidae
- Genus: Ochrus
- Species: O. tippmanni

Binomial name
- Ochrus tippmanni (Lane, 1956)

Species of beetle

Ochrus tippmanni is a species of beetle in the family Cerambycidae. It was described by Lane in 1956.
