= Cacophrissus maculipennis =

Scientific classification
- Kingdom: Animalia
- Phylum: Arthropoda
- Class: Insecta
- Order: Coleoptera
- Suborder: Polyphaga
- Infraorder: Cucujiformia
- Family: Cerambycidae
- Genus: Cacophrissus
- Species: C. maculipennis

Binomial name
- Cacophrissus maculipennis Chemsak & Linsley, 1963

Species of beetle

Cacophrissus maculipennis is a species of beetle in the family Cerambycidae. It was described by Chemsak and Linsley in 1963.
