= Haplidus =

Scientific classification
- Domain: Eukaryota
- Kingdom: Animalia
- Phylum: Arthropoda
- Class: Insecta
- Order: Coleoptera
- Suborder: Polyphaga
- Infraorder: Cucujiformia
- Family: Cerambycidae
- Tribe: Hesperophanini
- Genus: Haplidus

Genus of beetles

Haplidus is a genus of beetles in the family Cerambycidae, containing the following species:

- Haplidus glabricollis Chemsak & Linsley, 1964
- Haplidus laticeps Knull, 1941
- Haplidus mandibularis Chemsak & Linsley, 1963
- Haplidus nitidus Chemsak & Linsley, 1963
- Haplidus parvulus Chemsak & Linsley, 1963
- Haplidus pubescens Chemsak & Linsley, 1964
- Haplidus testaceus LeConte, 1873
