= Xeranoplium tricallosum =

Scientific classification
- Kingdom: Animalia
- Phylum: Arthropoda
- Class: Insecta
- Order: Coleoptera
- Suborder: Polyphaga
- Infraorder: Cucujiformia
- Family: Cerambycidae
- Genus: Xeranoplium
- Species: X. tricallosum

Binomial name
- Xeranoplium tricallosum (Knull, 1938)

Species of beetle

Xeranoplium tricallosum is a species of beetle in the family Cerambycidae. It was described by Knull in 1938.
