= Alastos batesi =

Scientific classification
- Domain: Eukaryota
- Kingdom: Animalia
- Phylum: Arthropoda
- Class: Insecta
- Order: Coleoptera
- Suborder: Polyphaga
- Infraorder: Cucujiformia
- Family: Cerambycidae
- Genus: Alastos
- Species: A. batesi

Binomial name
- Alastos batesi (Pascoe, 1888)

Species of beetle

Alastos batesi is a species of beetle in the family Cerambycidae. It was described by Pascoe in 1888.
