= Paraliostola =

Scientific classification
- Kingdom: Animalia
- Phylum: Arthropoda
- Class: Insecta
- Order: Coleoptera
- Suborder: Polyphaga
- Infraorder: Cucujiformia
- Family: Cerambycidae
- Tribe: Hesperophanini
- Genus: Paraliostola

Genus of beetles

Paraliostola is a genus of beetles in the family Cerambycidae, containing the following species:

- Paraliostola durantoni Tavakilian & Monné, 1991
- Paraliostola nigramacula Martins & Galileo, 2010
