= Xeranoplium pubescens =

Scientific classification
- Kingdom: Animalia
- Phylum: Arthropoda
- Class: Insecta
- Order: Coleoptera
- Suborder: Polyphaga
- Infraorder: Cucujiformia
- Family: Cerambycidae
- Genus: Xeranoplium
- Species: X. pubescens

Binomial name
- Xeranoplium pubescens Chemsak & Giesbert, 1986

Species of beetle

Xeranoplium pubescens is a species of beetle belonging to the Cerambycidae family. It was described by Chemsak and Giesbert in 1986.
