= Tippmannia rhamnusioides =

Scientific classification
- Kingdom: Animalia
- Phylum: Arthropoda
- Class: Insecta
- Order: Coleoptera
- Suborder: Polyphaga
- Infraorder: Cucujiformia
- Family: Cerambycidae
- Genus: Tippmannia
- Species: T. rhamnusioides

Binomial name
- Tippmannia rhamnusioides (Tippmann, 1953)

Species of beetle

Tippmannia rhamnusioides is a species of beetle in the family Cerambycidae. It was described by Tippmann in 1953.
