= Haplidus testaceus =

Scientific classification
- Domain: Eukaryota
- Kingdom: Animalia
- Phylum: Arthropoda
- Class: Insecta
- Order: Coleoptera
- Suborder: Polyphaga
- Infraorder: Cucujiformia
- Family: Cerambycidae
- Genus: Haplidus
- Species: H. testaceus

Binomial name
- Haplidus testaceus LeConte, 1873

Species of beetle

Haplidus testaceus is a species of beetle in the family Cerambycidae. It was described by John Lawrence LeConte in 1873.
