= Malobidion =

Scientific classification
- Kingdom: Animalia
- Phylum: Arthropoda
- Class: Insecta
- Order: Coleoptera
- Suborder: Polyphaga
- Infraorder: Cucujiformia
- Family: Cerambycidae
- Tribe: Hesperophanini
- Genus: Malobidion

Genus of beetles

Malobidion is a genus of beetles in the family Cerambycidae, containing the following species:

- Malobidion auricome Chemsak & Linsley, 1963
- Malobidion brunneum Schaeffer, 1908
- Malobidion grande Chemsak & Linsley, 1963
