= Ochrus ornatus =

Scientific classification
- Domain: Eukaryota
- Kingdom: Animalia
- Phylum: Arthropoda
- Class: Insecta
- Order: Coleoptera
- Suborder: Polyphaga
- Infraorder: Cucujiformia
- Family: Cerambycidae
- Genus: Ochrus
- Species: O. ornatus

Binomial name
- Ochrus ornatus (Fisher, 1935)

Species of beetle

Ochrus ornatus is a species of beetle in the family Cerambycidae. It was described by Fisher in 1935.
