= Hesperophymatus limexylon =

Scientific classification
- Kingdom: Animalia
- Phylum: Arthropoda
- Class: Insecta
- Order: Coleoptera
- Suborder: Polyphaga
- Infraorder: Cucujiformia
- Family: Cerambycidae
- Genus: Hesperophymatus
- Species: H. limexylon

Binomial name
- Hesperophymatus limexylon Zajciw, 1959

Species of beetle

Hesperophymatus limexylon is a species of beetle in the family Cerambycidae. It was described by Zajciw in 1959.
