= Hespereburia =

Scientific classification
- Kingdom: Animalia
- Phylum: Arthropoda
- Class: Insecta
- Order: Coleoptera
- Suborder: Polyphaga
- Infraorder: Cucujiformia
- Family: Cerambycidae
- Tribe: Hesperophanini
- Genus: Hespereburia

Genus of beetles

Hespereburia is a genus of beetles in the family Cerambycidae, containing the following species:

- Hespereburia balouporum Tavakilian & Monné, 1991
- Hespereburia blancheti Dalens & Tavakilian, 2009
- Hespereburia brachypa Bates, 1870
