= Perilasius =

Scientific classification
- Kingdom: Animalia
- Phylum: Arthropoda
- Class: Insecta
- Order: Coleoptera
- Suborder: Polyphaga
- Infraorder: Cucujiformia
- Family: Cerambycidae
- Tribe: Hesperophanini
- Genus: Perilasius

Genus of beetles

Perilasius is a genus of beetles in the family Cerambycidae, containing the following species:

- Perilasius brunneus Franz, 1954
- Perilasius championi Bates, 1880
