= Haplidus laticeps =

Scientific classification
- Domain: Eukaryota
- Kingdom: Animalia
- Phylum: Arthropoda
- Class: Insecta
- Order: Coleoptera
- Suborder: Polyphaga
- Infraorder: Cucujiformia
- Family: Cerambycidae
- Genus: Haplidus
- Species: H. laticeps

Binomial name
- Haplidus laticeps Knull, 1941

Species of beetle

Haplidus laticeps is a species of beetle in the family Cerambycidae. It was described by Knull in 1941.
