= Hesperanoplium antennatum =

Scientific classification
- Kingdom: Animalia
- Phylum: Arthropoda
- Class: Insecta
- Order: Coleoptera
- Suborder: Polyphaga
- Infraorder: Cucujiformia
- Family: Cerambycidae
- Genus: Hesperanoplium
- Species: H. antennatum

Binomial name
- Hesperanoplium antennatum (Linsley, 1932)

Species of beetle

Hesperanoplium antennatum is a species of beetle in the family Cerambycidae. It was described by Linsley in 1932.
