= Paraliostola durantoni =

Scientific classification
- Kingdom: Animalia
- Phylum: Arthropoda
- Class: Insecta
- Order: Coleoptera
- Suborder: Polyphaga
- Infraorder: Cucujiformia
- Family: Cerambycidae
- Genus: Paraliostola
- Species: P. durantoni

Binomial name
- Paraliostola durantoni Tavakilian & Monné, 1991

Species of beetle

Paraliostola durantoni is a species of beetle in the family Cerambycidae. It was described by Tavakilian and Monné in 1991.
