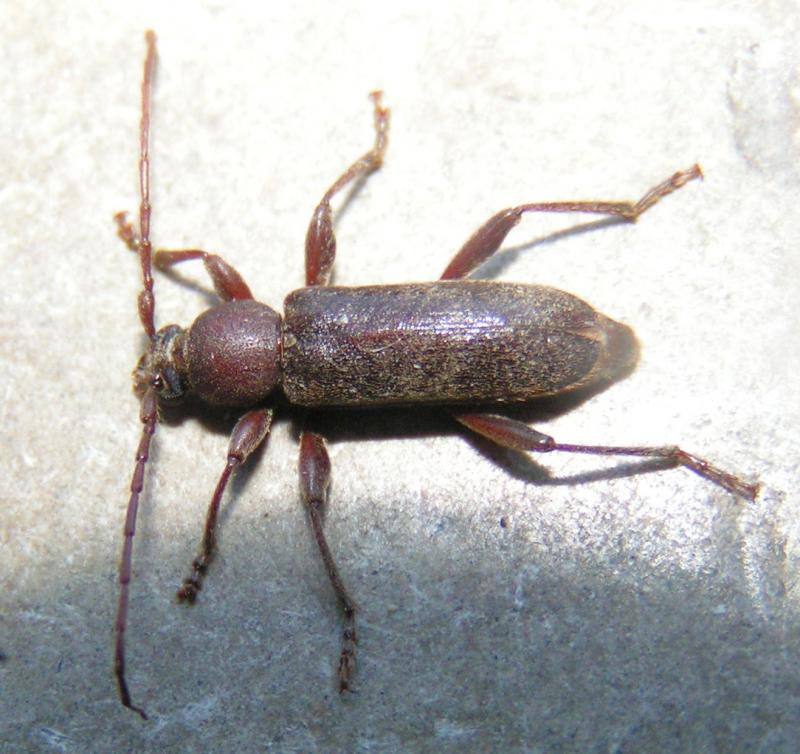

Scientific classification
- Domain: Eukaryota
- Kingdom: Animalia
- Phylum: Arthropoda
- Class: Insecta
- Order: Coleoptera
- Suborder: Polyphaga
- Infraorder: Cucujiformia
- Family: Cerambycidae
- Genus: Trichoferus
- Species: T. campestris

Binomial name
- Trichoferus campestris (Faldermann, 1835)

Synonyms
- Stromatium turkestanicum Heyden, 1886; Hesperophanes flavopubescens Kolbe, 1886; Hesperophanes rusticus Ganglbauer, 1887

= Trichoferus campestris =

Species of beetle

Trichoferus campestris, the velvet longhorned beetle, is a species of long-horned beetle in the family Cerambycidae.

== Distribution ==
Trichoferus campestris is native to eastern Asia including China, North Korea, South Korea, Japan, Mongolia and eastern Russia. Individuals or population records also exist in Armenia, Azerbaijan, Kazakhstan, Kyrgyzstan, Uzbekistan, Western Russia, Tajikistan and Turkmenistan. These populations are most likely the result of ancient introductions from Asiatic Russia but natural expansion could also be responsible.

In North America, individuals were first detected in 1997 in New Jersey, USA and has since become well established in USA and Canada.

The species has also been introduced into European countries including; Germany, Austria, Belgium, Belarus, France, Georgia, Greece, Hungary, Italy, Latvia, Lithuania, Moldova, Poland, Romania, UK, Slovakia, Sweden, Switzerland, Czechia and Ukraine.
