= Hesperanoplium notabile =

Scientific classification
- Kingdom: Animalia
- Phylum: Arthropoda
- Class: Insecta
- Order: Coleoptera
- Suborder: Polyphaga
- Infraorder: Cucujiformia
- Family: Cerambycidae
- Genus: Hesperanoplium
- Species: H. notabile

Binomial name
- Hesperanoplium notabile (Knull, 1947)

Species of beetle

Hesperanoplium notabile is a species of beetle in the family Cerambycidae. It was described by Knull in 1947.
