= Hesperophymatus chydaeus =

Scientific classification
- Kingdom: Animalia
- Phylum: Arthropoda
- Class: Insecta
- Order: Coleoptera
- Suborder: Polyphaga
- Infraorder: Cucujiformia
- Family: Cerambycidae
- Genus: Hesperophymatus
- Species: H. chydaeus

Binomial name
- Hesperophymatus chydaeus Martins & Monné, 1975

Species of beetle

Hesperophymatus chydaeus is a species of beetle in the family Cerambycidae. It was described by Martins and Monné in 1975.
