= Alastos =

Scientific classification
- Domain: Eukaryota
- Kingdom: Animalia
- Phylum: Arthropoda
- Class: Insecta
- Order: Coleoptera
- Suborder: Polyphaga
- Infraorder: Cucujiformia
- Family: Cerambycidae
- Tribe: Hesperophanini
- Genus: Alastos

Genus of beetles

Alastos is a genus of beetles in the family Cerambycidae, containing the following species:

- Alastos batesi (Pascoe, 1888)
- Alastos pascoei Martins & Galileo, 1999
