= Hespereburia balouporum =

Scientific classification
- Kingdom: Animalia
- Phylum: Arthropoda
- Class: Insecta
- Order: Coleoptera
- Suborder: Polyphaga
- Infraorder: Cucujiformia
- Family: Cerambycidae
- Genus: Hespereburia
- Species: H. balouporum

Binomial name
- Hespereburia balouporum Tavakilian & Monné, 1991

Species of beetle

Hespereburia balouporum is a species of beetle in the family Cerambycidae. It was described by Tavakilian and Monné in 1991.
