= Ochrus trifasciatus =

Scientific classification
- Kingdom: Animalia
- Phylum: Arthropoda
- Clade: Pancrustacea
- Class: Insecta
- Order: Coleoptera
- Suborder: Polyphaga
- Infraorder: Cucujiformia
- Family: Cerambycidae
- Genus: Ochrus
- Species: O. trifasciatus

Binomial name
- Ochrus trifasciatus Dalens & Touroult, 2011

Synonyms
- none

Species of insect

Ochrus trifasciatus is a species of beetle in the family Cerambycidae. It was described by Dalens and Touroult in 2011.
