= Ochrus chapadense =

Scientific classification
- Domain: Eukaryota
- Kingdom: Animalia
- Phylum: Arthropoda
- Class: Insecta
- Order: Coleoptera
- Suborder: Polyphaga
- Infraorder: Cucujiformia
- Family: Cerambycidae
- Genus: Ochrus
- Species: O. chapadense

Binomial name
- Ochrus chapadense Napp & Martins, 1982

Species of beetle

Ochrus chapadense is a species of beetle in the family Cerambycidae. It was described by Napp and Martins in 1982. It is found in central Brazil (Mato Grosso, Maranhão).
