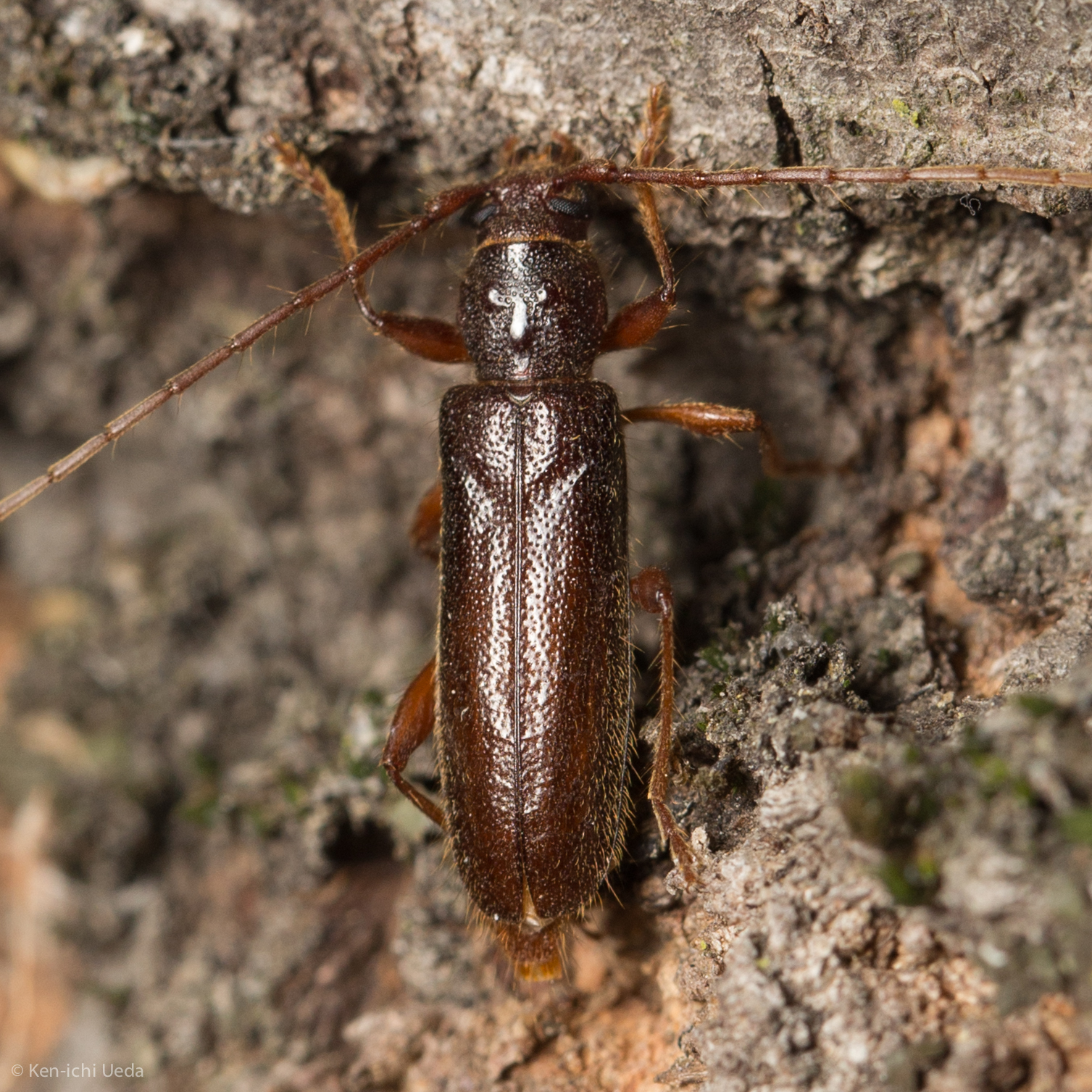
- Meganoplium imbelle, California

Scientific classification
- Kingdom: Animalia
- Phylum: Arthropoda
- Class: Insecta
- Order: Coleoptera
- Suborder: Polyphaga
- Infraorder: Cucujiformia
- Family: Cerambycidae
- Subfamily: Cerambycinae
- Tribe: Hesperophanini
- Genus: Meganoplium; Linsley, 1940
- Species: M. imbelle

Binomial name
- Meganoplium imbelle (LeConte, 1881)

= Meganoplium =

Genus of beetles

Meganoplium is a monotypic beetle genus in the family Cerambycidae described by Linsley in 1940. Its single species, Meganoplium imbelle, was first described by John Lawrence LeConte in 1881 as Elaphidion imbelle.

This species occurs in the US state of California and in northwestern Mexico. Its larvae have been observed feeding on dead live oak.
