= Zamodes =

Scientific classification
- Kingdom: Animalia
- Phylum: Arthropoda
- Class: Insecta
- Order: Coleoptera
- Suborder: Polyphaga
- Infraorder: Cucujiformia
- Family: Cerambycidae
- Genus: †Zamodes; LeConte, 1873
- Species: †Z. obscurus

Binomial name
- †Zamodes obscurus LeConte, 1873

Genus of beetles

Zamodes obscurus is a species of beetle in the family Cerambycidae and the only species in the genus Zamodes. It was described by John Lawrence LeConte in 1873 from a single specimen collected in Pennsylvania that is currently stored at the Museum of Comparative Zoology at Harvard University. This is the only specimen in existence, and the species is presumed to be extinct. It belongs to the tribe Hesperophanini.

== Description ==
Original description from LeConte, 1873:

Head moderate, front short, nearly perpendicular, frontal suture oblique- each side, deep; eyes coarsely granulated, deeply emarginate, upper part less narrow than usual; mandibles small, curved acute; palpi not very unequal, last joint triangular obliquely truncate. Antenna (male) a little longer than the body, punctured, finely pubescent, hispid with numerous long, erect flying hairs, thicker at the base, gradually attenuated externally, not sulcate nor carinated, 3d joint a little longer than the 4th, the latter and following ones nearly equal, 11th very feebly appendiculate. Prothorax rounded on the sides, constricted at the basal margin, without dorsal callosities. Elytra parallel, rounded at tip. Front coxal cavities round, not at all angulated externally; open behind, presternum very narrow between the coxse; middle coxae rather widely separated, scarcely angulated externally, rneso- sternura subtriangular, emarginate behind; metathorax emarginate behind, episterna narrow, scent pores not distinct; ventral segments equal, 1st a little longer, 5th rounded at tip, 6th not visible. Legs stout, thighs compressed, gradually tolerably strongly clavate, tibiae not carinate, spurs moderate, first joint of hind tarsi as long as the two following. The body is covered with fine short brown pubescence, with long erect hairs intermixed.
