= Malobidion brunneum =

Scientific classification
- Kingdom: Animalia
- Phylum: Arthropoda
- Class: Insecta
- Order: Coleoptera
- Suborder: Polyphaga
- Infraorder: Cucujiformia
- Family: Cerambycidae
- Genus: Malobidion
- Species: M. brunneum

Binomial name
- Malobidion brunneum Schaeffer, 1908

Species of beetle

Malobidion brunneum is a species of beetle in the family Cerambycidae. It was described by Schaeffer in 1908.
