= Tippmannia =

Scientific classification
- Kingdom: Animalia
- Phylum: Arthropoda
- Class: Insecta
- Order: Coleoptera
- Suborder: Polyphaga
- Infraorder: Cucujiformia
- Family: Cerambycidae
- Tribe: Hesperophanini
- Genus: Tippmannia

Genus of beetles

Tippmannia is a genus of beetles in the family Cerambycidae, containing the following species:

- Tippmannia bucki (Lane, 1973)
- Tippmannia olivascens (Lane, 1973)
- Tippmannia rhamnusioides (Tippmann, 1953)
