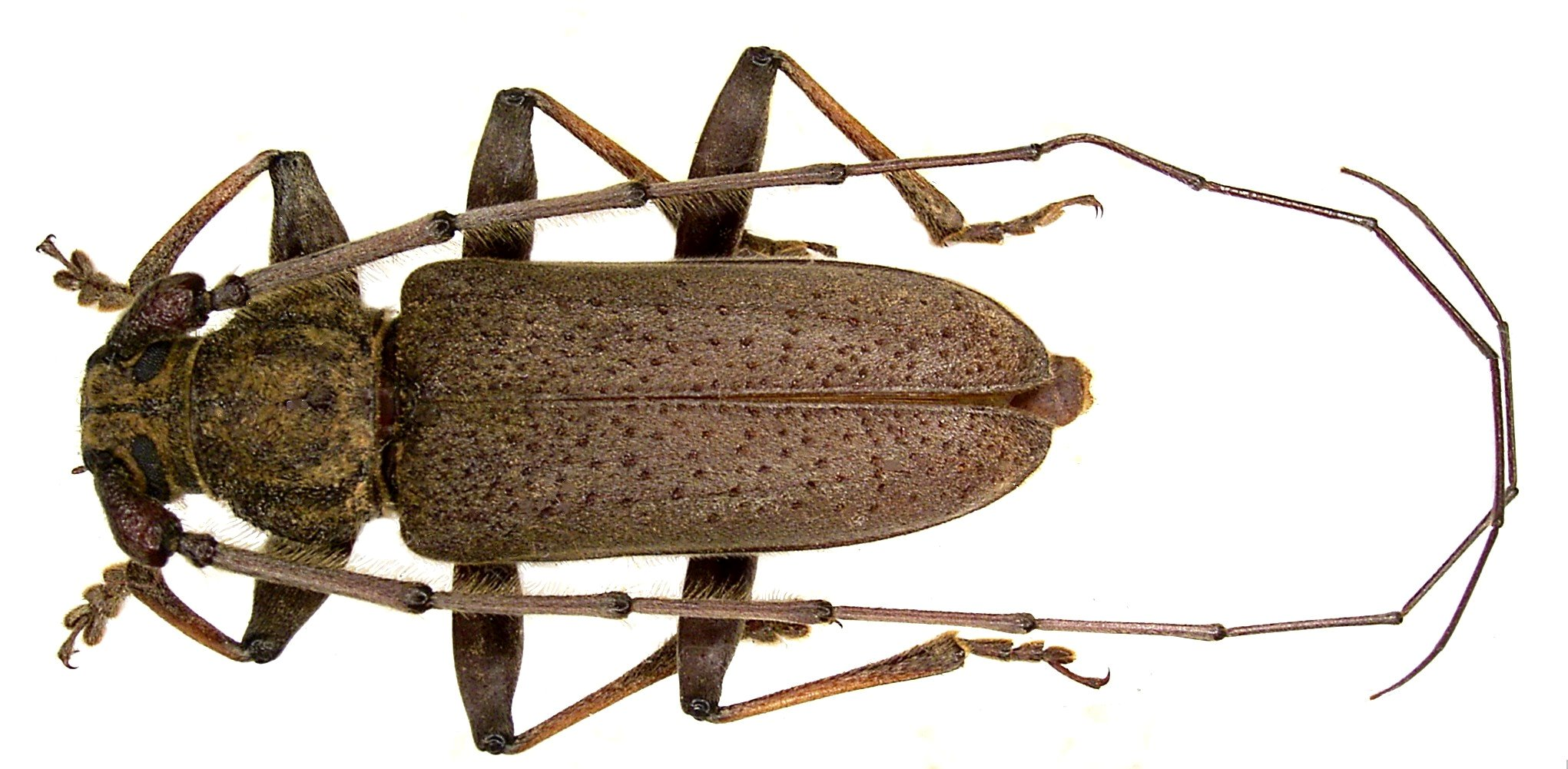

Scientific classification
- Domain: Eukaryota
- Kingdom: Animalia
- Phylum: Arthropoda
- Class: Insecta
- Order: Coleoptera
- Suborder: Polyphaga
- Infraorder: Cucujiformia
- Family: Cerambycidae
- Genus: Stromatium
- Species: S. longicorne

Binomial name
- Stromatium longicorne (Newman, 1842)

= Stromatium longicorne =

Species of beetle

Stromatium longicorne is a species of beetle in the family Cerambycidae. It was described by Newman in 1842.
