= Stromatium alienum =

Scientific classification
- Domain: Eukaryota
- Kingdom: Animalia
- Phylum: Arthropoda
- Class: Insecta
- Order: Coleoptera
- Suborder: Polyphaga
- Infraorder: Cucujiformia
- Family: Cerambycidae
- Genus: Stromatium
- Species: S. alienum

Binomial name
- Stromatium alienum Pascoe, 1857

Species of beetle

Stromatium alienum is a species of beetle in the family Cerambycidae. It was described by Pascoe in 1857.
