= Hesperophanes pubescens =

Scientific classification
- Domain: Eukaryota
- Kingdom: Animalia
- Phylum: Arthropoda
- Class: Insecta
- Order: Coleoptera
- Suborder: Polyphaga
- Infraorder: Cucujiformia
- Family: Cerambycidae
- Genus: Hesperophanes
- Species: H. pubescens

Binomial name
- Hesperophanes pubescens (Haldeman, 1847)

Species of beetle

Hesperophanes pubescens is a species of long-horned beetle in the family Cerambycidae. It is found in North America.
