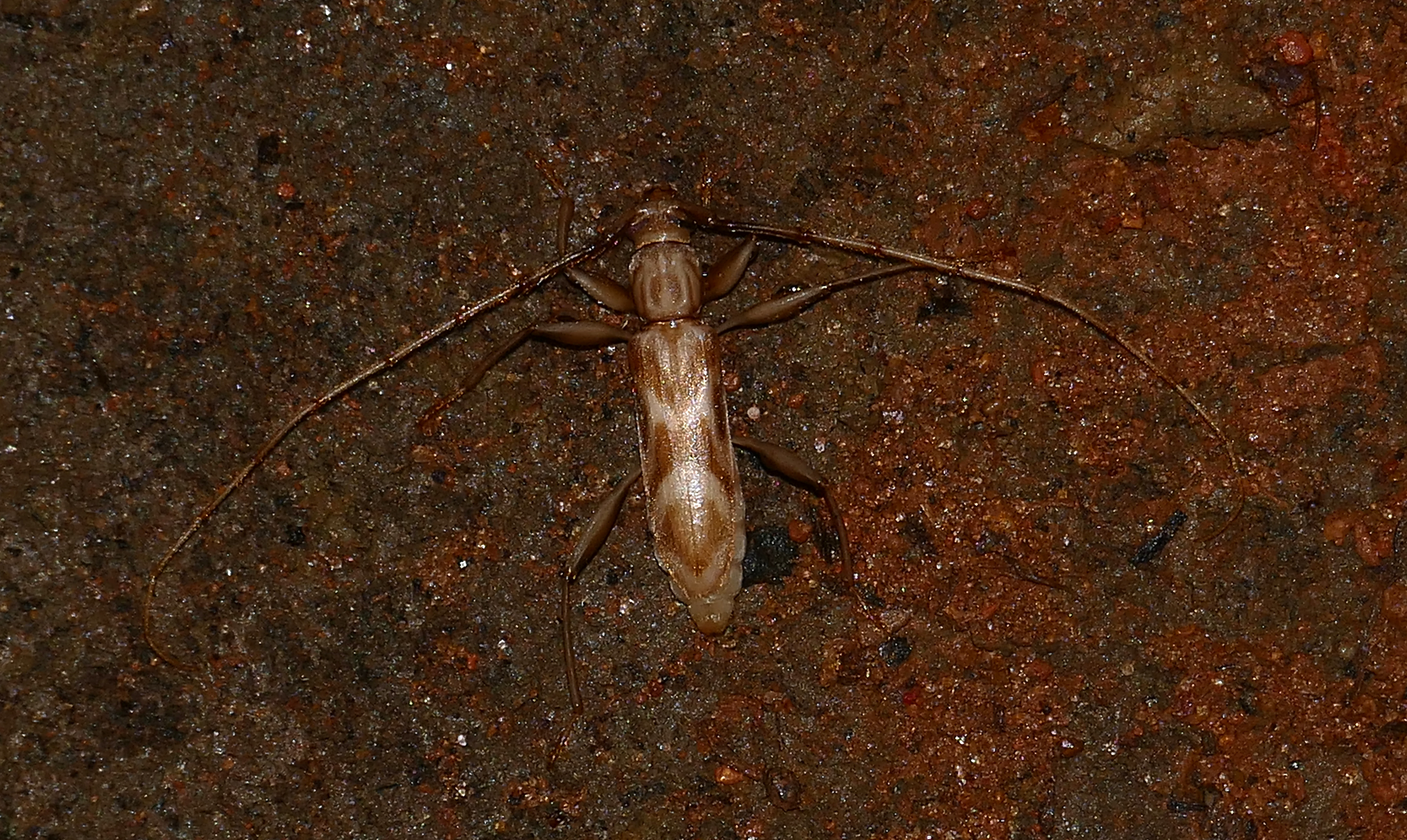
- Ochrus grammoderus

Scientific classification
- Domain: Eukaryota
- Kingdom: Animalia
- Phylum: Arthropoda
- Class: Insecta
- Order: Coleoptera
- Suborder: Polyphaga
- Infraorder: Cucujiformia
- Family: Cerambycidae
- Tribe: Hesperophanini
- Genus: Ochrus

= Ochrus =

Genus of beetles

Ochrus is a genus of beetles in the family Cerambycidae, containing the following species:

- Ochrus chapadense Napp & Martins, 1982
- Ochrus duplicatus Napp & Martins, 1982
- Ochrus grammoderus Lacordaire, 1869
- Ochrus ornatus (Fisher, 1935)
- Ochrus tippmanni (Lane, 1956)
- Ochrus trifasciatus Dalens & Touroult, 2011
