= Hesperophymatus =

Scientific classification
- Kingdom: Animalia
- Phylum: Arthropoda
- Class: Insecta
- Order: Coleoptera
- Suborder: Polyphaga
- Infraorder: Cucujiformia
- Family: Cerambycidae
- Tribe: Hesperophanini
- Genus: Hesperophymatus

Genus of beetles

Hesperophymatus is a genus of beetles in the family Cerambycidae, containing the following species:

- Hesperophymatus chydaeus Martins & Monné, 1975
- Hesperophymatus limexylon Zajciw, 1959
