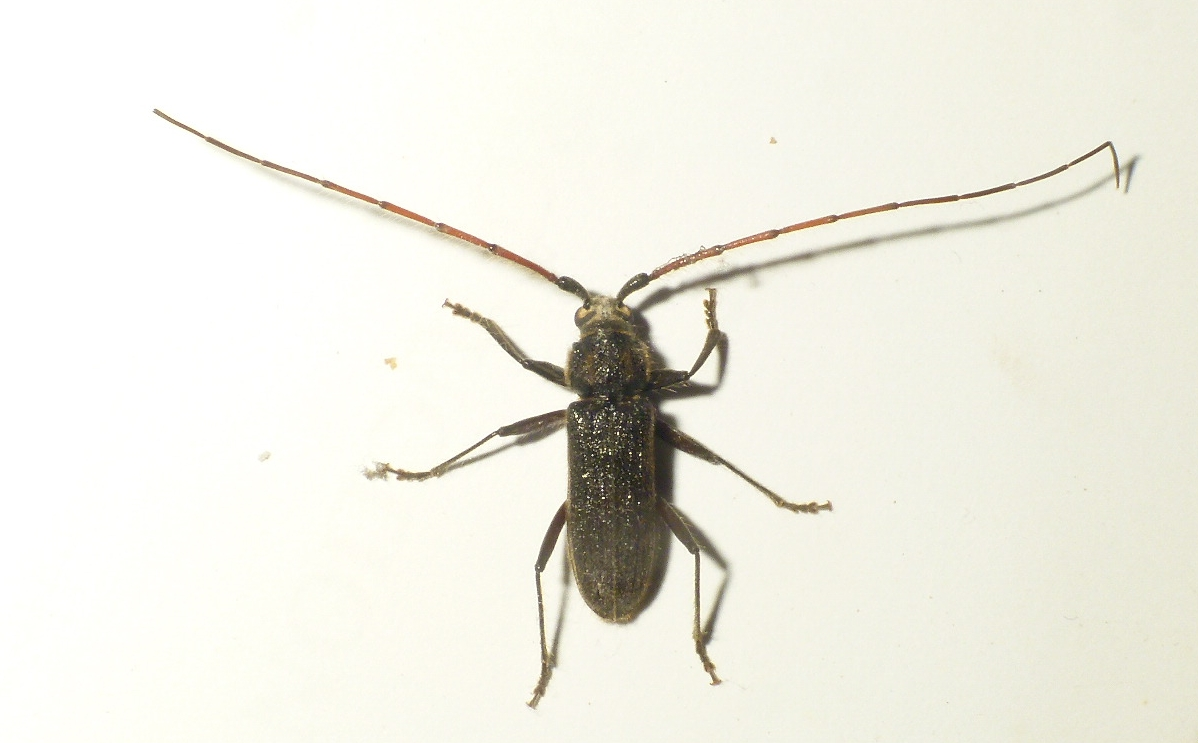
- Male

Scientific classification
- Domain: Eukaryota
- Kingdom: Animalia
- Phylum: Arthropoda
- Class: Insecta
- Order: Coleoptera
- Suborder: Polyphaga
- Infraorder: Cucujiformia
- Family: Cerambycidae
- Genus: Stromatium
- Species: S. barbatum

Binomial name
- Stromatium barbatum (Fabricius, 1775)

= Stromatium barbatum =

Species of beetle

Stromatium barbatum (common names: teak trunk borer and Kulsi teak borer) is a species of beetle in the family Cerambycidae. This species is native to the Oriental region. It has been recorded in mainland India, the Andaman Islands, Myanmar, Sri Lanka, Mauritius, Réunion and Seychelles. This species has also spread to continental Africa and Madagascar.

== Description ==
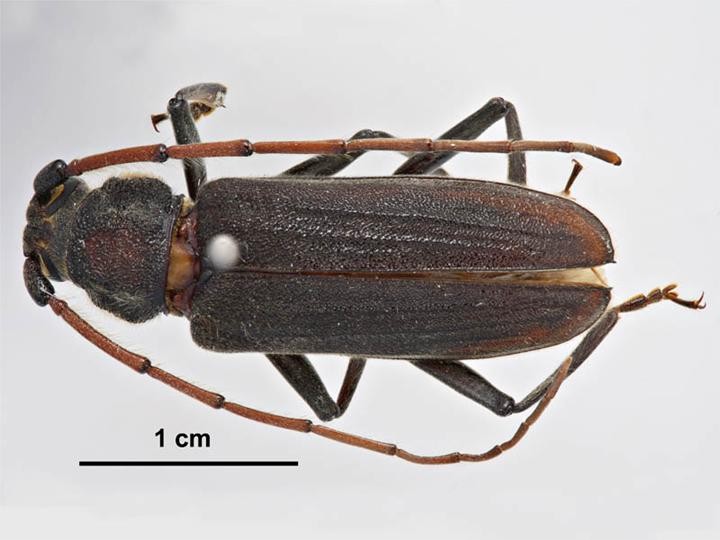
Stromatium barbatum specimen from Museum Victoria.

Length: 16–26.5 millimetres (0.63–1.04 in).
Breadth: 4–7.5 millimetres (0.16–0.30 in).

Varies in colour from brownish black to reddish brown, faintly covered with tawny pubescence. Head densely and rather coarsely punctured above and at the sides, as densely but less strongly punctured in front. Prothorax very densely covered with strong coarse punctures; the disc with five slightly raised tubercles, less distinct in the male, placed two anteriorly, one behind the middle, and two near the base; the sides broadly and obtusely protuberant except near the base, in the female; straighter and marked each with a large tomentose depression, extending along the greater part of its length, in the male. Elytra coarsely and very densely punctured; each with two tolerably distinct dorsal and one or two short lateral costae, the latter sometimes obsolete; a short sutural tooth at apex.

— Charles Joseph Gahan in The Fauna of British India, Including Ceylon and Burma - Coleoptera: Cerambycidae (1906)

== Natural history ==
Stromatium barbatum is extremely polyphagous; the list of recorded host plants exceeds 300. It prefers seasoned timbers, and is commonly found in household furniture, rafters, door and window frames, and other wooden structures. It is considered as an important timber pest species.
