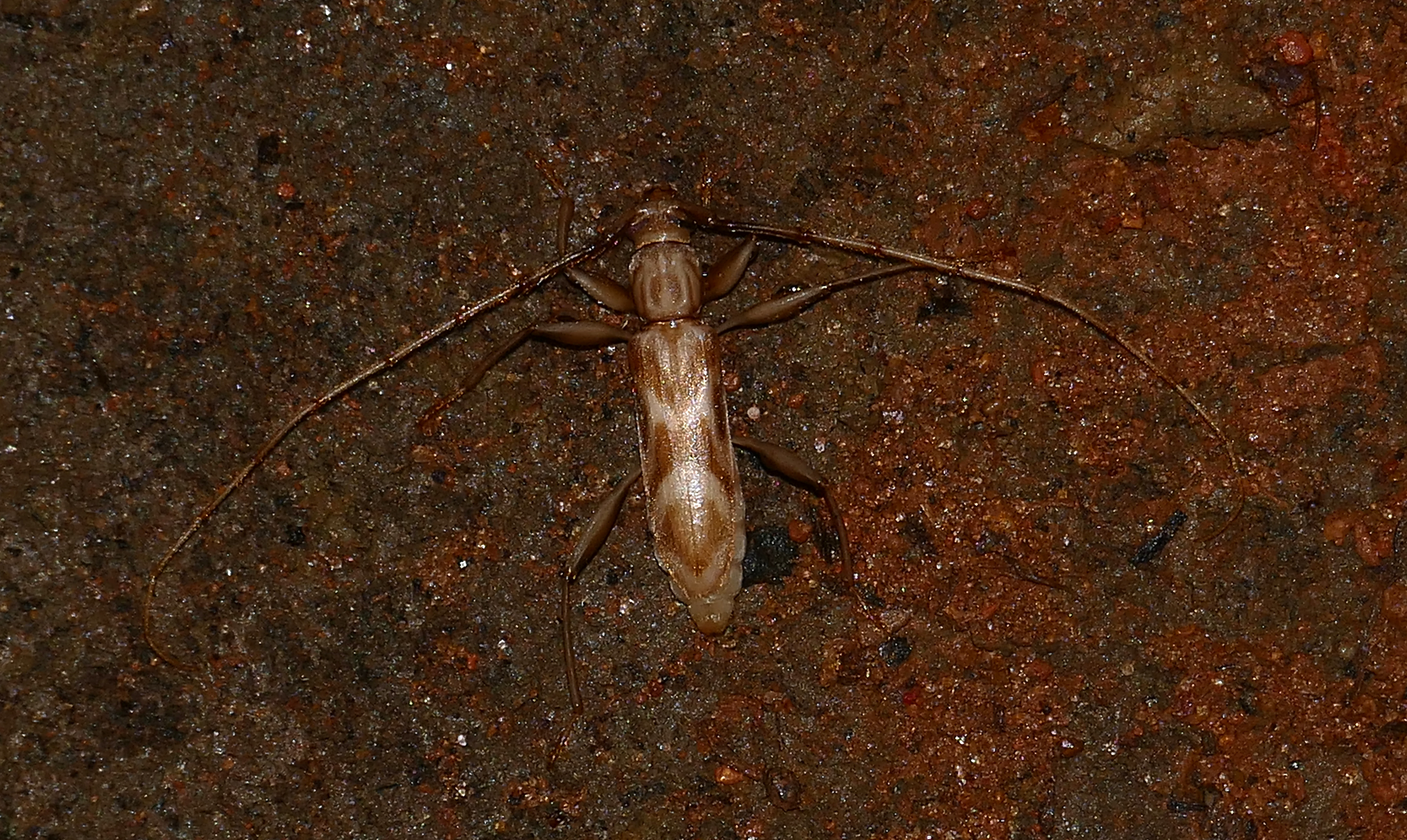

Scientific classification
- Domain: Eukaryota
- Kingdom: Animalia
- Phylum: Arthropoda
- Class: Insecta
- Order: Coleoptera
- Suborder: Polyphaga
- Infraorder: Cucujiformia
- Family: Cerambycidae
- Genus: Ochrus
- Species: O. grammoderus

Binomial name
- Ochrus grammoderus Lacordaire, 1869

= Ochrus grammoderus =

Species of beetle

Ochrus grammoderus is a species of beetle in the family Cerambycidae. It was described by Lacordaire in 1869.
