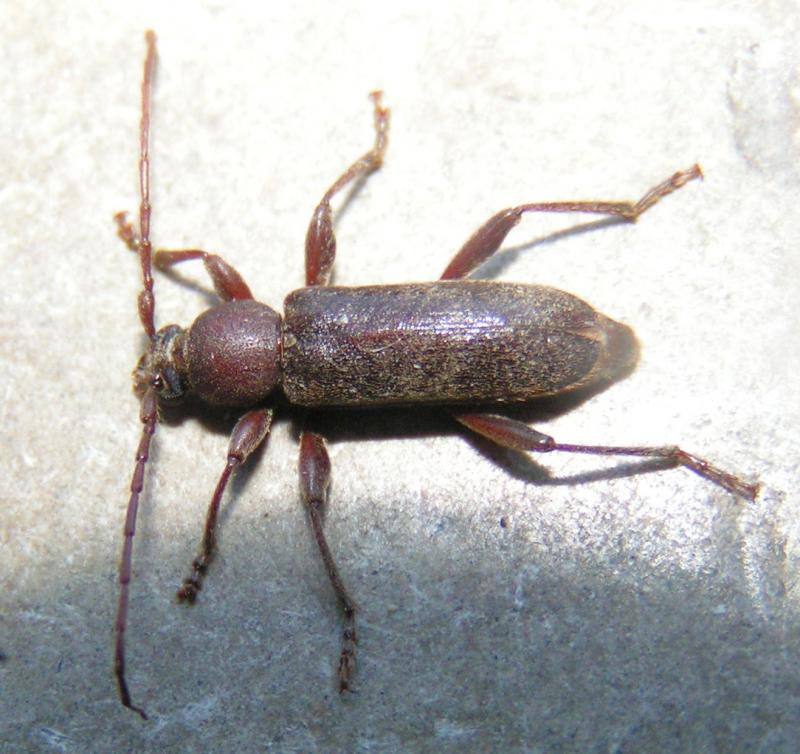
- Trichoferus campestris

Scientific classification
- Domain: Eukaryota
- Kingdom: Animalia
- Phylum: Arthropoda
- Class: Insecta
- Order: Coleoptera
- Suborder: Polyphaga
- Infraorder: Cucujiformia
- Family: Cerambycidae
- Tribe: Hesperophanini
- Genus: Trichoferus; Wollaston, 1854

= Trichoferus =

Genus of beetles

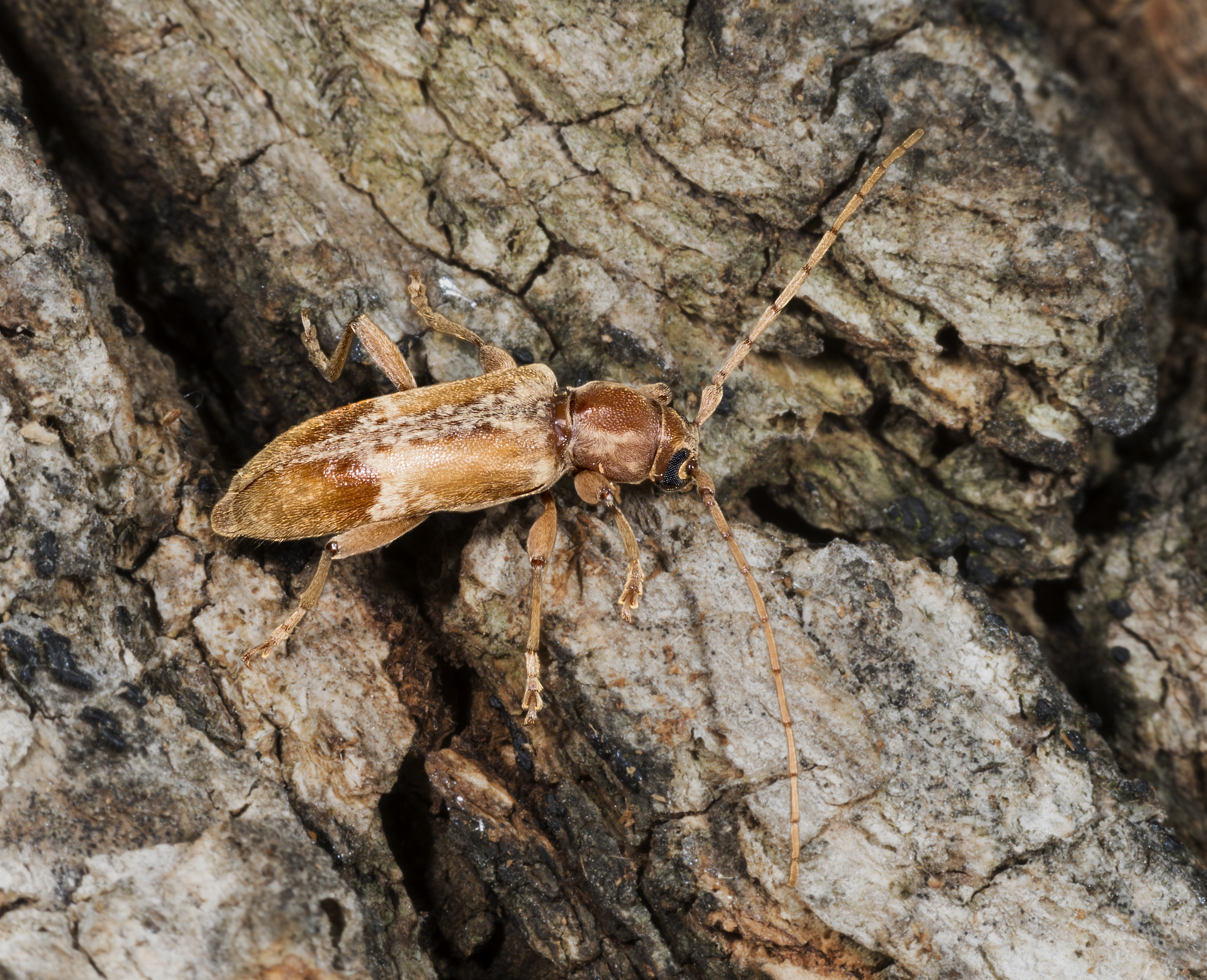
Trichoferus pallidus

Trichoferus is a genus of long-horned beetles in the family Cerambycidae. There are at least 20 described species in Trichoferus.

== Species ==
These 27 species belong to the genus Trichoferus:

- Trichoferus antonioui Sama, 1994^{c g}
- Trichoferus arenbergeri Holzschuh, 1995^{c g}
- Trichoferus berberidis Sama, 1994^{c g}
- Trichoferus bergeri Holzschuh, 1982^{c g}
- Trichoferus campestris (Faldermann, 1835)^{c g b} (velvet longhorned beetle)
- Trichoferus cisti Sama, 1987^{c g}
- Trichoferus cribricollis (Bates, 1878)^{c g}
- Trichoferus fasciculatus (Faldermann, 1837)^{c g}
- Trichoferus fissitarsis Sama, Fallahzadeh & Rapuzzi, 2005^{c g}
- Trichoferus georgioui Sama & Makris, 2001^{c g}
- Trichoferus georgiui Sama & Makris, 2001^{g}
- Trichoferus griseus (Fabricius, 1793)^{c g}
- Trichoferus guerryi (Pic, 1915)^{c g}
- Trichoferus holosericeus (Rossi, 1790)^{c g}
- Trichoferus ilicis Sama, 1987^{c g}
- Trichoferus ivoi Kadlec, 2005^{c g}
- Trichoferus kotschyi Ganglbauer, 1883^{c g}
- Trichoferus lunatus (Szallies, 1994)^{c g}
- Trichoferus maculatus Pu, 1991^{c g}
- Trichoferus magnanii Sama, 1992^{c g}
- Trichoferus pallidus (Olivier, 1790)^{c g}
- Trichoferus preissi (Heyden, 1894)^{c g}
- Trichoferus robustipes Holzschuh, 2003^{c g}
- Trichoferus samai Kadlec & Rejzek, 2001^{c g}
- Trichoferus sbordonii Sama, 1982^{c g}
- Trichoferus semipunctatus Holzschuh, 2003^{c g}
- Trichoferus spartii (Müller, 1948)^{c g}

Data sources: i = ITIS, c = Catalogue of Life, g = GBIF, b = Bugguide.net
