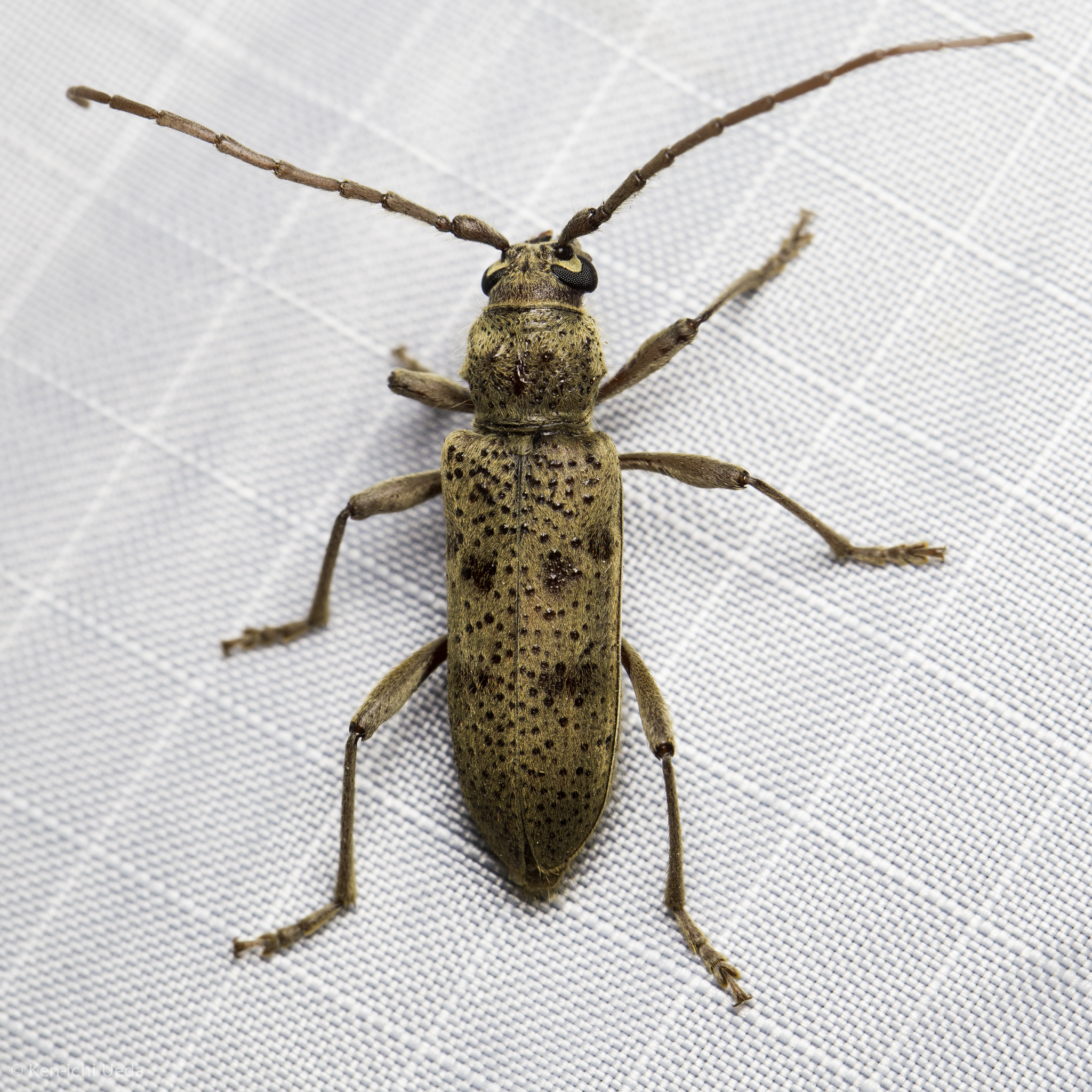

Scientific classification
- Domain: Eukaryota
- Kingdom: Animalia
- Phylum: Arthropoda
- Class: Insecta
- Order: Coleoptera
- Suborder: Polyphaga
- Infraorder: Cucujiformia
- Family: Cerambycidae
- Genus: Brothylus
- Species: B. gemmulatus

Binomial name
- Brothylus gemmulatus LeConte, 1859

= Brothylus gemmulatus =

Species of beetle

Brothylus gemmulatus is a species of beetle in the family Cerambycidae.
