= Hespereburia blancheti =

Scientific classification
- Kingdom: Animalia
- Phylum: Arthropoda
- Class: Insecta
- Order: Coleoptera
- Suborder: Polyphaga
- Infraorder: Cucujiformia
- Family: Cerambycidae
- Genus: Hespereburia
- Species: H. blancheti

Binomial name
- Hespereburia blancheti Dalens & Tavakilian, 2009

Species of beetle

Hespereburia blancheti is a species of beetle in the family Cerambycidae. It was described by Dalens and Tavakilian in 2009.
