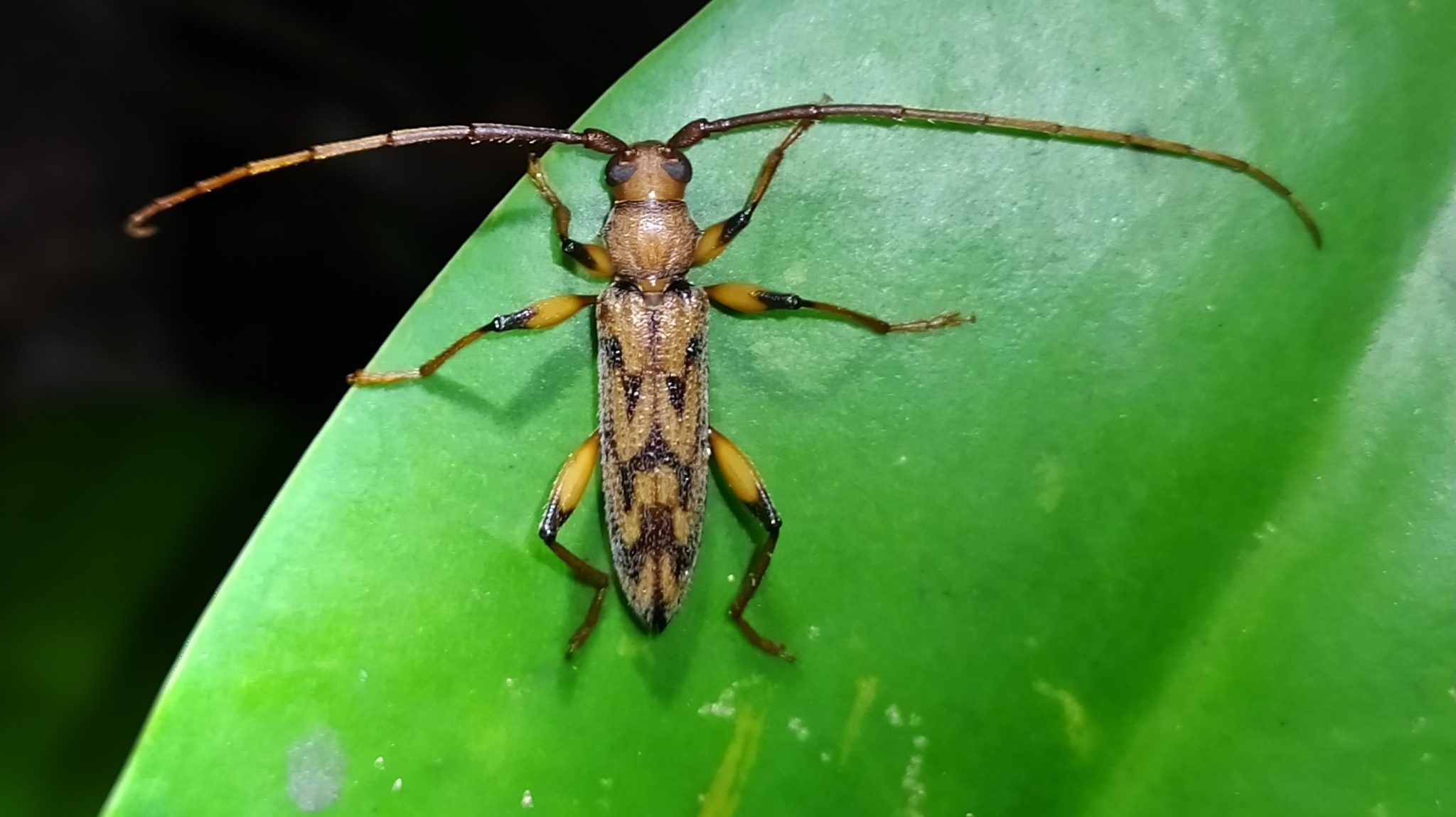

Scientific classification
- Kingdom: Animalia
- Phylum: Arthropoda
- Clade: Pancrustacea
- Class: Insecta
- Order: Coleoptera
- Suborder: Polyphaga
- Infraorder: Cucujiformia
- Family: Cerambycidae
- Tribe: Hesperophanini
- Genus: Phrynocris; Bates, 1867
- Species: P. notabilis

Binomial name
- Phrynocris notabilis Bates, 1867

= Phrynocris =

Genus of beetles

Phrynocris notabilis is a species of beetle in the family Cerambycidae, the only species in the genus Phrynocris. The species was originally described by Henry Walter Bates in 1867.

== Description ==
Phrynocris notabilis is a beetle that is primarily found in the northern part of South America and Central America.

== Range ==
The species have been observed in Costa Rica, French Guiana and Brazil

== Taxonomy ==
Phrynocris notabilis is a Monotypic taxon which was described in 1867.

Phrynocris, n. g.
Body elongated, sub-depressed. Muzzle short, eyes coarsely facetted; antenniferous tubercles
prominent. Antennæ elongated, filiform, unarmed; basal joint with a tubercle near the apex
beneath. Thorax sub-quadrate, armed on each side with a spine. Elytra prolonged at the apex,
and each terminating gradually in a sharp spine; surface punctured, and with rows of small
tubercles. Legs stout, thighs large and strongly clavate.

Ph. notabillis, n. sp. 10 lines. ♂. Head and thorax coarsely and scantily
tomentose, rest of the body clothed with short hairs. Thorax uneven, and covered
with small scattered tubercles. Reddish-tawny. Thorax with the depressed parts
black. Elytra ornamented with three strongly undulated black belts, the apex also
black; surface shining, punctured and roughened with three or four rows of
small tubercles; tips of thighs and tibiae black.
