= Hesperanoplium =

Scientific classification
- Kingdom: Animalia
- Phylum: Arthropoda
- Class: Insecta
- Order: Coleoptera
- Suborder: Polyphaga
- Infraorder: Cucujiformia
- Family: Cerambycidae
- Tribe: Hesperophanini
- Genus: Hesperanoplium

Genus of beetles

Hesperanoplium is a genus of beetles in the family Cerambycidae, containing the following species:

- Hesperanoplium antennatum (Linsley, 1932)
- Hesperanoplium notabile (Knull, 1947)
