= Tylonotus masoni =

Scientific classification
- Kingdom: Animalia
- Phylum: Arthropoda
- Class: Insecta
- Order: Coleoptera
- Suborder: Polyphaga
- Infraorder: Cucujiformia
- Family: Cerambycidae
- Genus: Tylonotus
- Species: T. masoni

Binomial name
- Tylonotus masoni (Knull, 1928)

Species of beetle

Tylonotus masoni is a species of beetle in the family Cerambycidae. It was described by Knull in 1928.
