= Cacophrissus =

Scientific classification
- Kingdom: Animalia
- Phylum: Arthropoda
- Class: Insecta
- Order: Coleoptera
- Suborder: Polyphaga
- Infraorder: Cucujiformia
- Family: Cerambycidae
- Tribe: Hesperophanini
- Genus: Cacophrissus

Genus of beetles

Cacophrissus is a genus of beetles in the family Cerambycidae, containing the following species:

- Cacophrissus maculipennis Chemsak & Linsley, 1963
- Cacophrissus pauper Bates, 1885
- Cacophrissus pubescens Chemsak & Linsley, 1963
