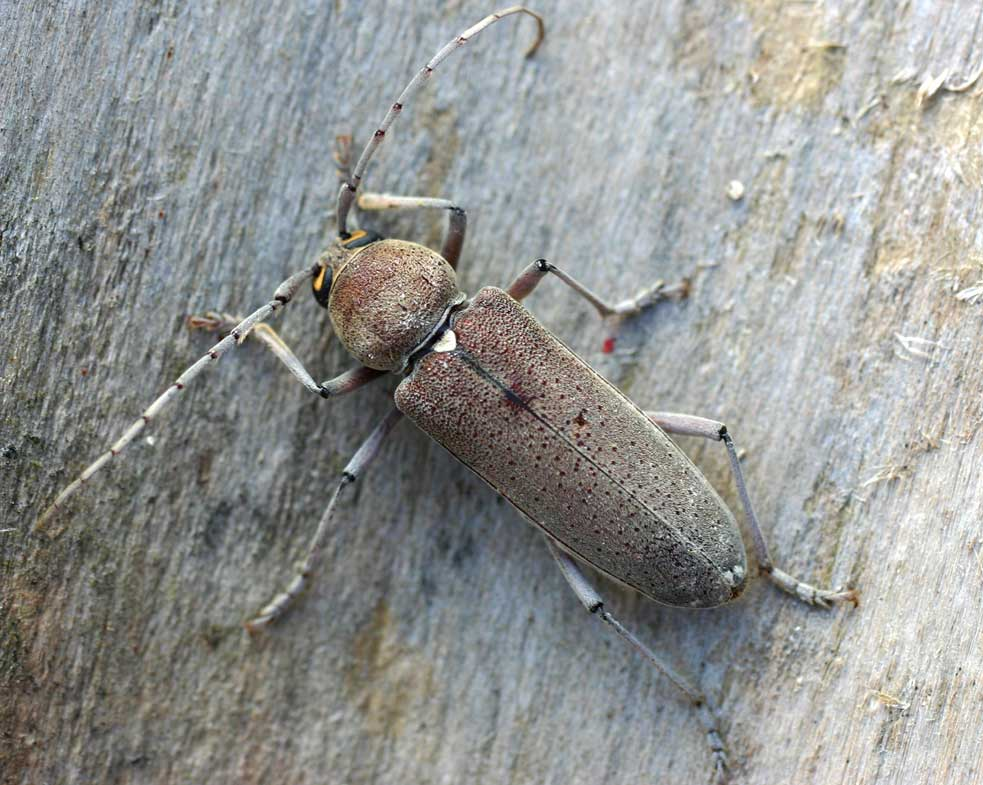
- Hesperophanes sericeus

Scientific classification
- Kingdom: Animalia
- Phylum: Arthropoda
- Class: Insecta
- Order: Coleoptera
- Suborder: Polyphaga
- Infraorder: Cucujiformia
- Family: Cerambycidae
- Tribe: Hesperophanini
- Genus: Hesperophanes; Dejean, 1835

Synonyms
- Anoplium Haldeman, 1847; Trichoferus Wollaston, 1854

= Hesperophanes =

Genus of beetles

Hesperophanes is a genus of long-horned beetles in the family Cerambycidae. There are about eight described species in Hesperophanes.

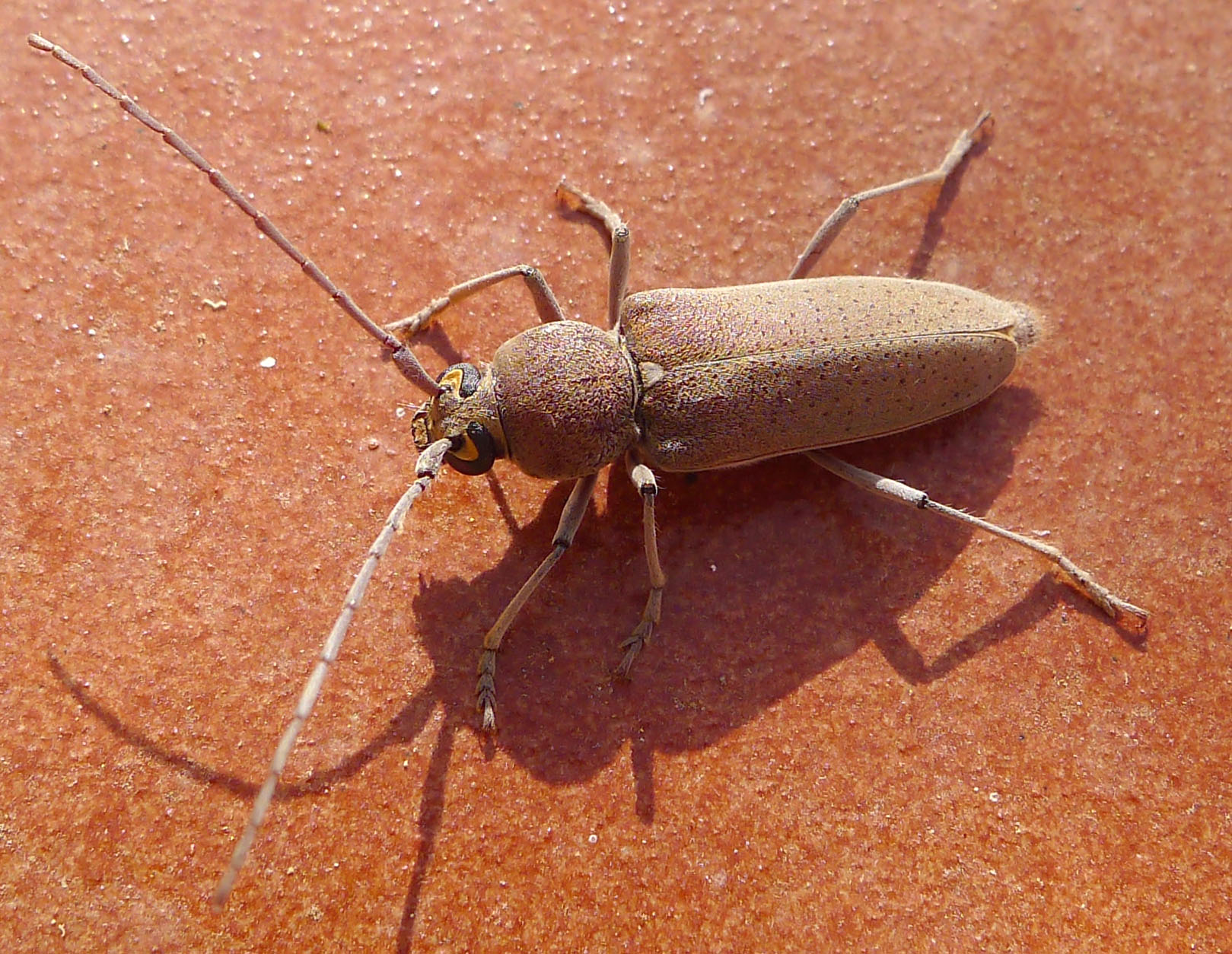
Hesperophanes sericeus

== Species ==
These eight species belong to the genus Hesperophanes:

- Hesperophanes andresi Sama & Rapuzzi, 2006^{c g}
- Hesperophanes erosus Gahan, 1894^{c g}
- Hesperophanes heydeni Baeckmann, 1923^{c g}
- Hesperophanes melonii Fancello & Cillo, 2012^{c g}
- Hesperophanes pilosus Bodungen, 1908^{c g}
- Hesperophanes pubescens (Haldeman, 1847)^{i c g b}
- Hesperophanes sericeus (Fabricius, 1787)^{c g}
- Hesperophanes zerbibi Lepesme & Breuning, 1955^{c g}

Data sources: i = ITIS, c = Catalogue of Life, g = GBIF, b = Bugguide.net
