= Perilasius brunneus =

Scientific classification
- Kingdom: Animalia
- Phylum: Arthropoda
- Class: Insecta
- Order: Coleoptera
- Suborder: Polyphaga
- Infraorder: Cucujiformia
- Family: Cerambycidae
- Genus: Perilasius
- Species: P. brunneus

Binomial name
- Perilasius brunneus Franz, 1954

Species of beetle

Perilasius brunneus is a species of beetle in the family Cerambycidae. It was described by Franz in 1954.
