= Perilasius championi =

Scientific classification
- Kingdom: Animalia
- Phylum: Arthropoda
- Class: Insecta
- Order: Coleoptera
- Suborder: Polyphaga
- Infraorder: Cucujiformia
- Family: Cerambycidae
- Genus: Perilasius
- Species: P. championi

Binomial name
- Perilasius championi Bates, 1880

Species of beetle

Perilasius championi is a species of beetle in the family Cerambycidae. It was described by Bates in 1880.
