= Tippmannia bucki =

Scientific classification
- Kingdom: Animalia
- Phylum: Arthropoda
- Class: Insecta
- Order: Coleoptera
- Suborder: Polyphaga
- Infraorder: Cucujiformia
- Family: Cerambycidae
- Genus: Tippmannia
- Species: T. bucki

Binomial name
- Tippmannia bucki (Lane, 1973)

Species of beetle

Tippmannia bucki is a species of beetle in the family Cerambycidae. It was described by Lane in 1973.
