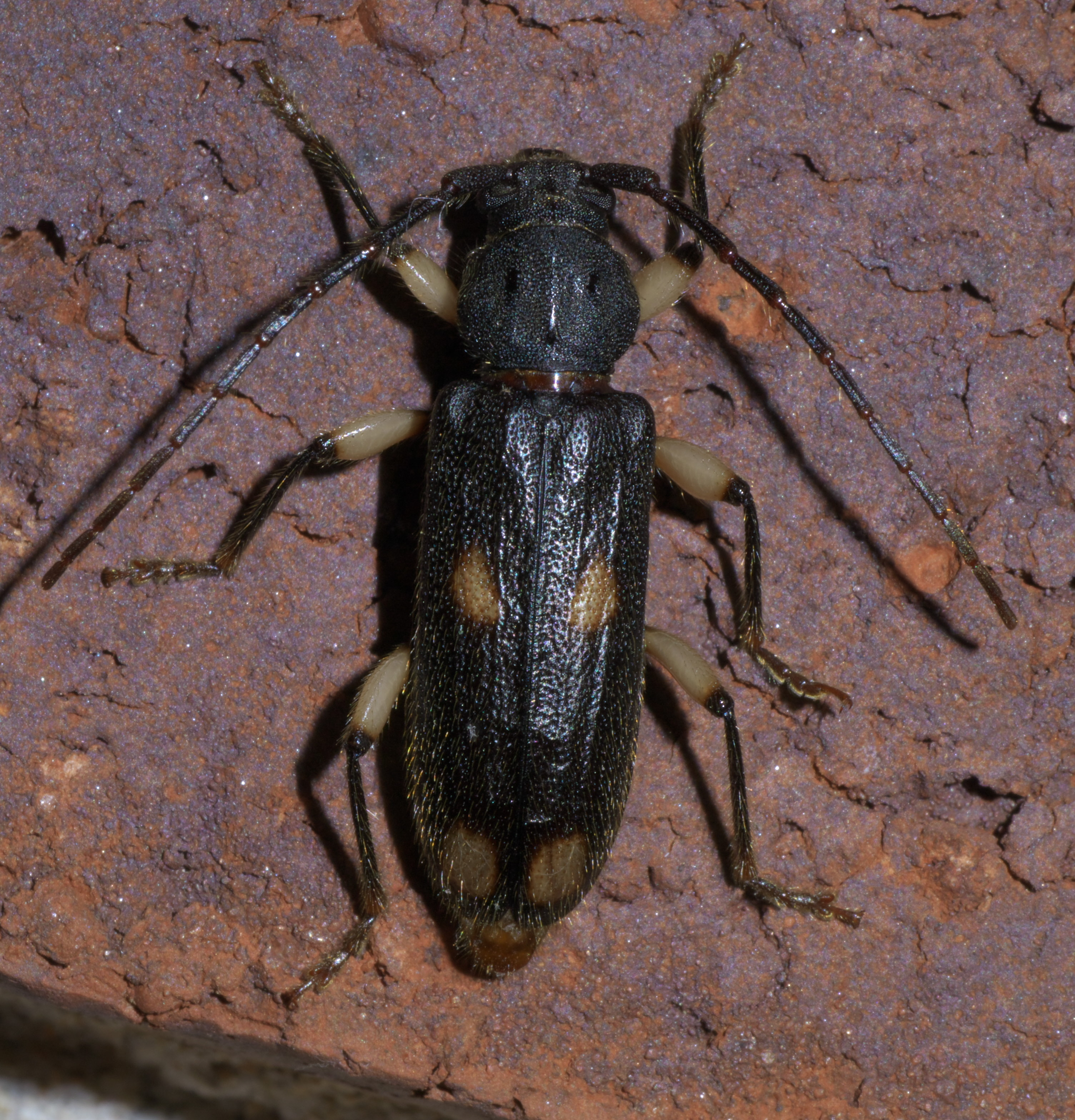

Scientific classification
- Domain: Eukaryota
- Kingdom: Animalia
- Phylum: Arthropoda
- Class: Insecta
- Order: Coleoptera
- Suborder: Polyphaga
- Infraorder: Cucujiformia
- Family: Cerambycidae
- Genus: Tylonotus
- Species: T. bimaculatus

Binomial name
- Tylonotus bimaculatus Haldeman, 1847

= Tylonotus bimaculatus =

Species of beetle

Tylonotus bimaculatus is a species of beetle in the family Cerambycidae. It was described by Haldeman in 1847.
