= Paraliostola nigramacula =

Scientific classification
- Kingdom: Animalia
- Phylum: Arthropoda
- Class: Insecta
- Order: Coleoptera
- Suborder: Polyphaga
- Infraorder: Cucujiformia
- Family: Cerambycidae
- Genus: Paraliostola
- Species: P. nigramacula

Binomial name
- Paraliostola nigramacula Martins & Galileo, 2010

Species of beetle

Paraliostola nigramacula is a species of beetle in the family Cerambycidae. It was described by Martins and Galileo in 2010.
