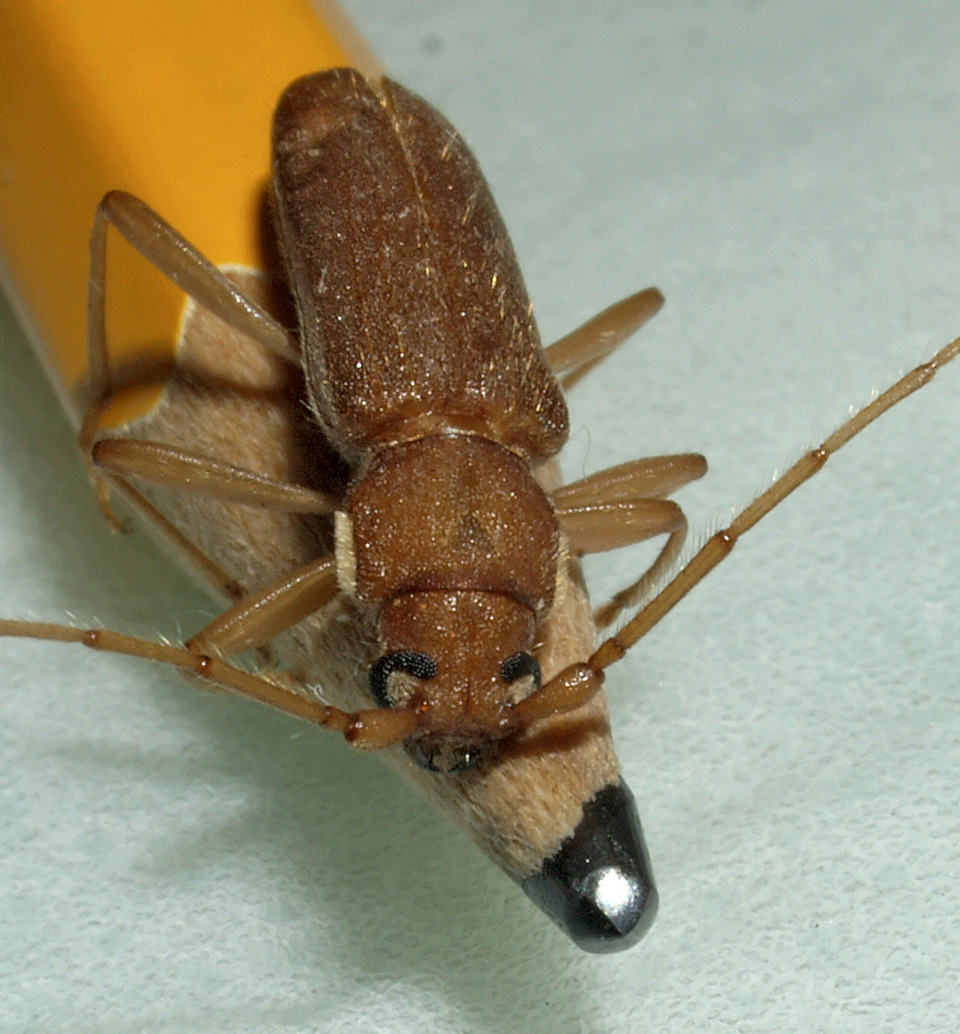

Scientific classification
- Kingdom: Animalia
- Phylum: Arthropoda
- Clade: Pancrustacea
- Class: Insecta
- Order: Coleoptera
- Suborder: Polyphaga
- Infraorder: Cucujiformia
- Family: Cerambycidae
- Genus: Stromatium
- Species: S. fulvum

Binomial name
- Stromatium fulvum (Villers, 1789)

Synonyms
- Cerambyx Fulvus Villers, 1789 (preocc., but see text); Saperda aurata Böber, 1793; Callidium unicolor Olivier, 1795; Callidium strepens Fabricius, 1798; Callidium pallidum Zoubkoff, 1833 (preocc.); Stromatium inermis Tournier, 1872; Hesperophanes platyfemur Chevrolat, 1882

= Stromatium fulvum =

Species of beetle

Stromatium fulvum is a species of beetle in the family Cerambycidae. It was first described by Charles Joseph Devillers in 1789, and while his name was preoccupied, it is treated as valid following ICZN Article 23.9.5; it has most commonly been referred to as Stromatium unicolor, and more recently as Stromatium auratum but these names are junior synonyms.
