= Eusapia =

Scientific classification
- Kingdom: Animalia
- Phylum: Arthropoda
- Class: Insecta
- Order: Coleoptera
- Suborder: Polyphaga
- Infraorder: Cucujiformia
- Family: Cerambycidae
- Tribe: Hesperophanini
- Genus: Eusapia

Genus of beetles

Eusapia is a genus of beetles in the family Cerambycidae, containing the following species:

- Eusapia amazonica (White, 1855)
- Eusapia guyanensis Huedepohl, 1988
- Eusapia matogrossensis Huedepohl, 1988
