= Alastos pascoei =

Scientific classification
- Domain: Eukaryota
- Kingdom: Animalia
- Phylum: Arthropoda
- Class: Insecta
- Order: Coleoptera
- Suborder: Polyphaga
- Infraorder: Cucujiformia
- Family: Cerambycidae
- Genus: Alastos
- Species: A. pascoei

Binomial name
- Alastos pascoei Martins & Galileo, 1999

Species of beetle

Alastos pascoei is a species of beetle in the family Cerambycidae. It was described by Martins and Galileo in 1999.
