= Eusapia matogrossensis =

Scientific classification
- Kingdom: Animalia
- Phylum: Arthropoda
- Class: Insecta
- Order: Coleoptera
- Suborder: Polyphaga
- Infraorder: Cucujiformia
- Family: Cerambycidae
- Genus: Eusapia
- Species: E. matogrossensis

Binomial name
- Eusapia matogrossensis Huedepohl, 1988

Species of beetle

Eusapia matogrossensis is a species of beetle in the family Cerambycidae. It was described by Huedepohl, in 1988.
