= Xeranoplium =

Scientific classification
- Kingdom: Animalia
- Phylum: Arthropoda
- Class: Insecta
- Order: Coleoptera
- Suborder: Polyphaga
- Infraorder: Cucujiformia
- Family: Cerambycidae
- Subfamily: Cerambycinae
- Tribe: Hesperophanini
- Genus: Xeranoplium; Linsley, 1957

Genus of beetles

Xeranoplium is a genus of beetles in the family Cerambycidae, containing the following species:

- Xeranoplium bicolor Chemsak & Linsley, 1963
- Xeranoplium flavofemoratum Chemsak & Linsley, 1963
- Xeranoplium gracilis Fisher, 1932
- Xeranoplium peninsulare Chemsak & Linsley, 1963
- Xeranoplium pubescens Chemsak & Giesbert, 1986
- Xeranoplium puncticolle Chemsak & Linsley, 1963
- Xeranoplium ruficolle Chemsak & Linsley, 1963
- Xeranoplium tricallosum (Knull, 1938)
