= Heteraneflus =

Heteraneflus castaneus

Scientific classification
- Kingdom: Animalia
- Phylum: Arthropoda
- Class: Insecta
- Order: Coleoptera
- Suborder: Polyphaga
- Infraorder: Cucujiformia
- Family: Cerambycidae
- Genus: Heteraneflus
- Species: H. castaneus

Binomial name
- Heteraneflus castaneus Chemsak & Linsley, 1963

Genus of beetles

Heteraneflus castaneus is a species of beetle in the family Cerambycidae, the only species in the genus Heteraneflus.
