= Oraphanes =

Oraphanes binotatum

Scientific classification
- Kingdom: Animalia
- Phylum: Arthropoda
- Class: Insecta
- Order: Coleoptera
- Suborder: Polyphaga
- Infraorder: Cucujiformia
- Family: Cerambycidae
- Genus: Oraphanes
- Species: O. binotatum

Binomial name
- Oraphanes binotatum Chemsak & Linsley, 1984

Genus of beetles

Oraphanes binotatum is a species of beetle in the family Cerambycidae, the only species in the genus Oraphanes.
