= Potiaete =

Potiaete maculata

Scientific classification
- Kingdom: Animalia
- Phylum: Arthropoda
- Class: Insecta
- Order: Coleoptera
- Suborder: Polyphaga
- Infraorder: Cucujiformia
- Family: Cerambycidae
- Genus: Potiaete
- Species: P. maculata

Binomial name
- Potiaete maculata Martins & Galileo, 1999

Genus of beetles

Potiaete maculata is a species of beetle in the family Cerambycidae, the only species in the genus Potiaete.
