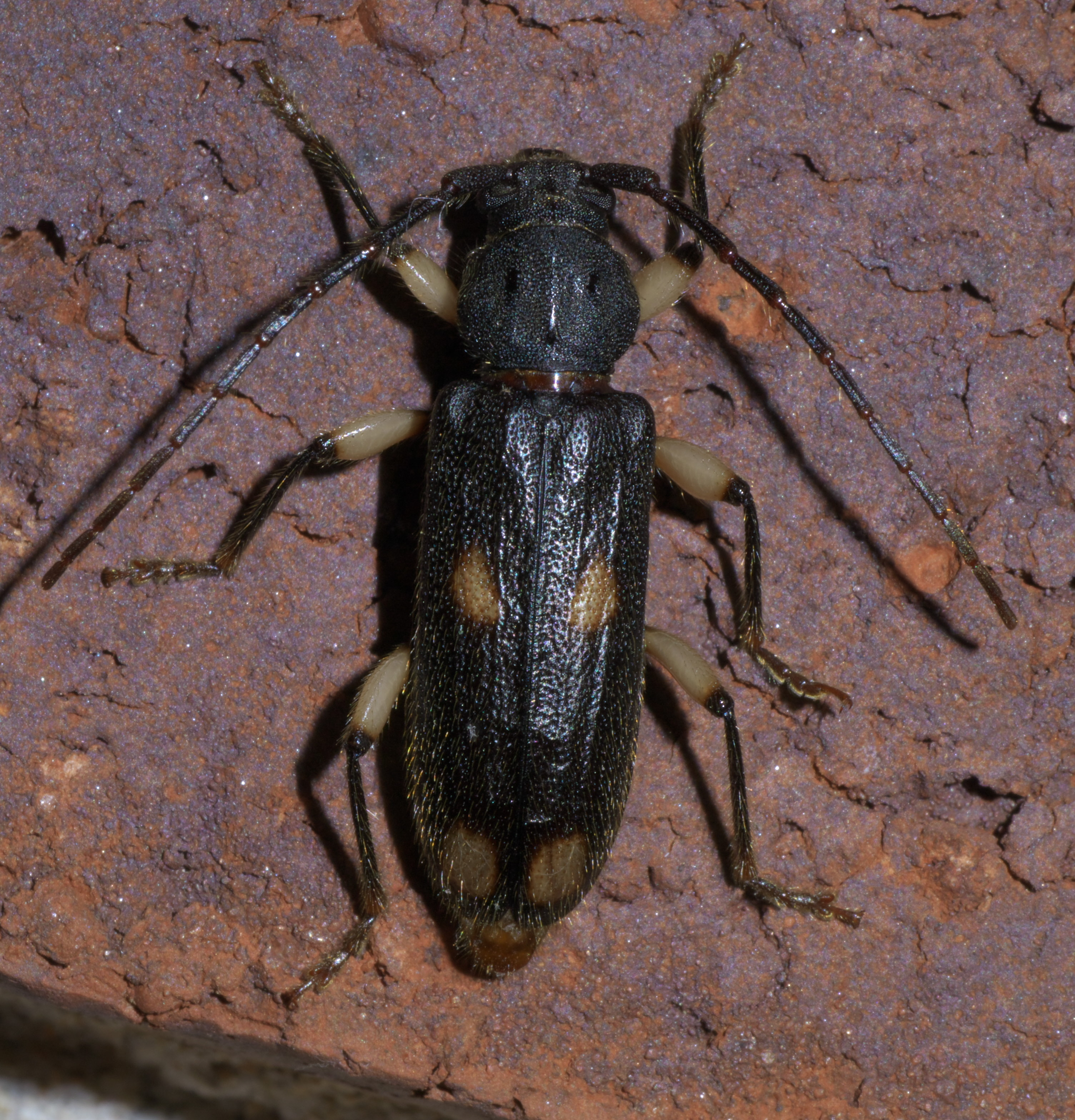
- Tylonotus bimaculatus

Scientific classification
- Kingdom: Animalia
- Phylum: Arthropoda
- Class: Insecta
- Order: Coleoptera
- Suborder: Polyphaga
- Infraorder: Cucujiformia
- Family: Cerambycidae
- Genus: Tylonotus

= Tylonotus =

Genus of beetles

Tylonotus is a genus of beetles in the family Cerambycidae, containing the following species:

- Tylonotus bimaculatus Haldeman, 1847
- Tylonotus masoni (Knull, 1928)
