= Parandraceps =

Parandraceps turnbowi

Scientific classification
- Kingdom: Animalia
- Phylum: Arthropoda
- Class: Insecta
- Order: Coleoptera
- Suborder: Polyphaga
- Infraorder: Cucujiformia
- Family: Cerambycidae
- Genus: Parandraceps
- Species: P. turnbowi

Binomial name
- Parandraceps turnbowi Giesbert, 1998

Genus of beetles

Parandraceps turnbowi is a species of beetle in the family Cerambycidae, the only species in the genus Parandraceps.
