= Liostola =

Liostola nitida

Scientific classification
- Kingdom: Animalia
- Phylum: Arthropoda
- Class: Insecta
- Order: Coleoptera
- Suborder: Polyphaga
- Infraorder: Cucujiformia
- Family: Cerambycidae
- Genus: Liostola
- Species: L. nitida

Binomial name
- Liostola nitida Zajciw, 1962

Genus of beetles

Liostola nitida is a species of beetle in the family Cerambycidae, the only species in the genus Liostola.
