= Catoptronotum =

Catoptronotum bipenicillatum

Scientific classification
- Kingdom: Animalia
- Phylum: Arthropoda
- Class: Insecta
- Order: Coleoptera
- Suborder: Polyphaga
- Infraorder: Cucujiformia
- Family: Cerambycidae
- Genus: Catoptronotum
- Species: C. bipenicillatum

Binomial name
- Catoptronotum bipenicillatum Zajciw, 1959

Genus of beetles

Catoptronotum bipenicillatum is a species of beetle in the family Cerambycidae, the only species in the genus Catoptronotum.
