= Eucrossus =

Eucrossus villicornis

Scientific classification
- Kingdom: Animalia
- Phylum: Arthropoda
- Class: Insecta
- Order: Coleoptera
- Suborder: Polyphaga
- Infraorder: Cucujiformia
- Family: Cerambycidae
- Genus: Eucrossus
- Species: E. villicornis

Binomial name
- Eucrossus villicornis LeConte, 1873

Genus of beetles

Eucrossus villicornis is a species of beetle in the family Cerambycidae, the only species in the genus Eucrossus.
