= Stromatium chilense =

Scientific classification
- Domain: Eukaryota
- Kingdom: Animalia
- Phylum: Arthropoda
- Class: Insecta
- Order: Coleoptera
- Suborder: Polyphaga
- Infraorder: Cucujiformia
- Family: Cerambycidae
- Genus: Stromatium
- Species: S. chilense

Binomial name
- Stromatium chilense Cerda, 1968

Species of beetle

Stromatium chilense is a species of beetle in the family Cerambycidae. It was described by Cerda in 1968.
