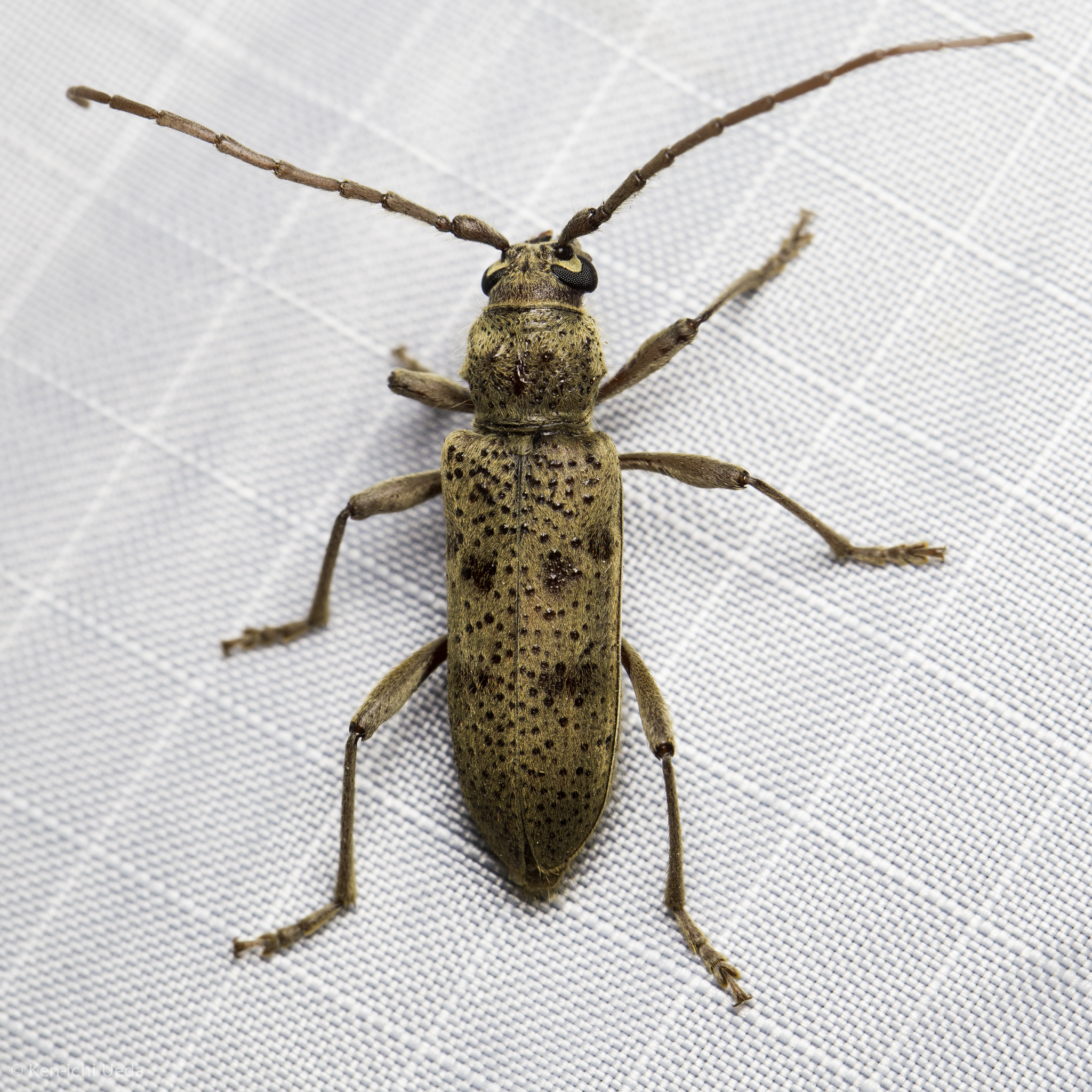
- Brothylus gemmulatus

Scientific classification
- Kingdom: Animalia
- Phylum: Arthropoda
- Class: Insecta
- Order: Coleoptera
- Suborder: Polyphaga
- Infraorder: Cucujiformia
- Family: Cerambycidae
- Genus: Brothylus; LeConte, 1859

= Brothylus =

Genus of beetles

Brothylus is a genus of beetles in the family Cerambycidae, containing the following species:

- Brothylus conspersus LeConte, 1859
- Brothylus gemmulatus LeConte, 1859
