= Liosteburia =

Liosteburia bleuzeni

Scientific classification
- Kingdom: Animalia
- Phylum: Arthropoda
- Class: Insecta
- Order: Coleoptera
- Suborder: Polyphaga
- Infraorder: Cucujiformia
- Family: Cerambycidae
- Genus: Liosteburia
- Species: L. bleuzeni

Binomial name
- Liosteburia bleuzeni Tavakilian & Monné, 1991

Genus of beetles

Liosteburia bleuzeni is a species of beetle in the family Cerambycidae, the only species in the genus Liosteburia.
