= Corupella =

Corupella asperata

Scientific classification
- Kingdom: Animalia
- Phylum: Arthropoda
- Class: Insecta
- Order: Coleoptera
- Suborder: Polyphaga
- Infraorder: Cucujiformia
- Family: Cerambycidae
- Genus: Corupella
- Species: C. asperata

Binomial name
- Corupella asperata Martins & Napp, 2007

Genus of beetles

Corupella asperata is a species of beetle in the family Cerambycidae, the only species in the genus Corupella.
