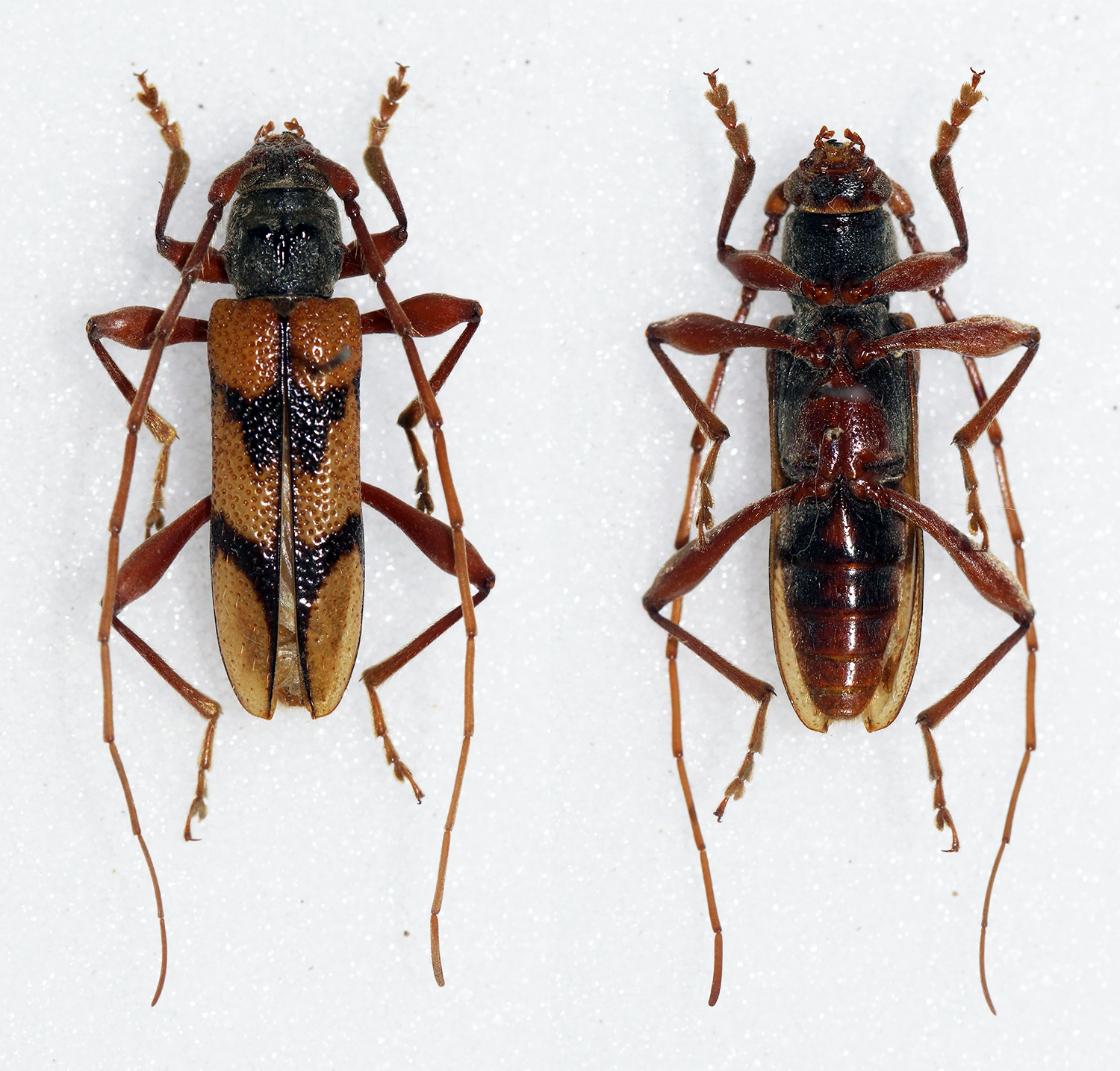

Scientific classification
- Kingdom: Animalia
- Phylum: Arthropoda
- Class: Insecta
- Order: Coleoptera
- Suborder: Polyphaga
- Infraorder: Cucujiformia
- Family: Cerambycidae
- Genus: Phymatioderus
- Species: P. bizonatus

Binomial name
- Phymatioderus bizonatus Blanchard in Orbigny, 1847

= Phymatioderus =

Phymatioderus bizonatus

Genus of beetles

Phymatioderus bizonatus is a species of beetle in the family Cerambycidae, the only species in the genus Phymatioderus.
