= Austranoplium =

Austranoplium concolor

Scientific classification
- Kingdom: Animalia
- Phylum: Arthropoda
- Class: Insecta
- Order: Coleoptera
- Suborder: Polyphaga
- Infraorder: Cucujiformia
- Family: Cerambycidae
- Genus: Austranoplium
- Species: A. concolor

Binomial name
- Austranoplium concolor Chemsak & Linsley, 1963

Genus of beetles

Austranoplium concolor is a species of beetle in the family Cerambycidae, the only species in the genus Austranoplium.
