= Vilchesia =

Vilchesia valenciai

Scientific classification
- Kingdom: Animalia
- Phylum: Arthropoda
- Class: Insecta
- Order: Coleoptera
- Suborder: Polyphaga
- Infraorder: Cucujiformia
- Family: Cerambycidae
- Genus: Vilchesia
- Species: V. valenciai

Binomial name
- Vilchesia valenciai Cerda, 1980

Genus of beetles

Vilchesia valenciai is a species of beetle in the family Cerambycidae, the only species in the genus Vilchesia.
