= Megosmidus =

Megosmidus tuberculatus

Scientific classification
- Kingdom: Animalia
- Phylum: Arthropoda
- Class: Insecta
- Order: Coleoptera
- Suborder: Polyphaga
- Infraorder: Cucujiformia
- Family: Cerambycidae
- Genus: Megosmidus
- Species: M. tuberculatus

Binomial name
- Megosmidus tuberculatus Hovore, 1988

Genus of beetles

Megosmidus tuberculatus is a species of beetle in the family Cerambycidae, the only species in the genus Megosmidus.
