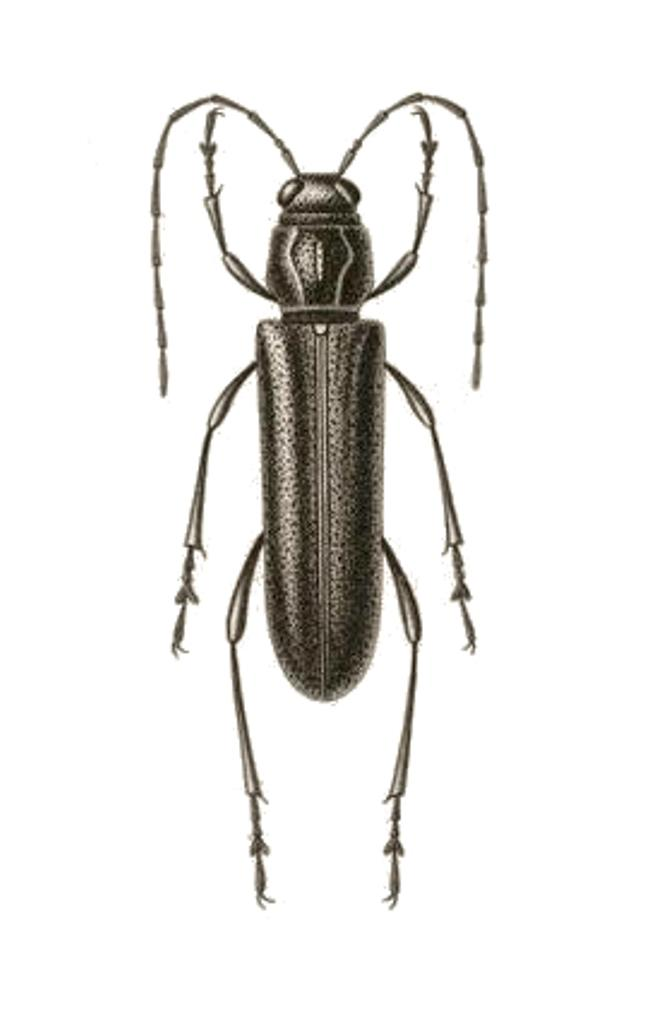
- Grammicosum flavofasciatum

Scientific classification
- Kingdom: Animalia
- Phylum: Arthropoda
- Class: Insecta
- Order: Coleoptera
- Suborder: Polyphaga
- Infraorder: Cucujiformia
- Family: Cerambycidae
- Genus: Grammicosum
- Species: G. flavofasciatum

Binomial name
- Grammicosum flavofasciatum Blanchard in Orbigny, 1847

= Grammicosum =

Grammicosum flavofasciatum

Genus of beetles

Grammicosum flavofasciatum is a species of beetle in the family Cerambycidae, the only species in the genus Grammicosum.
