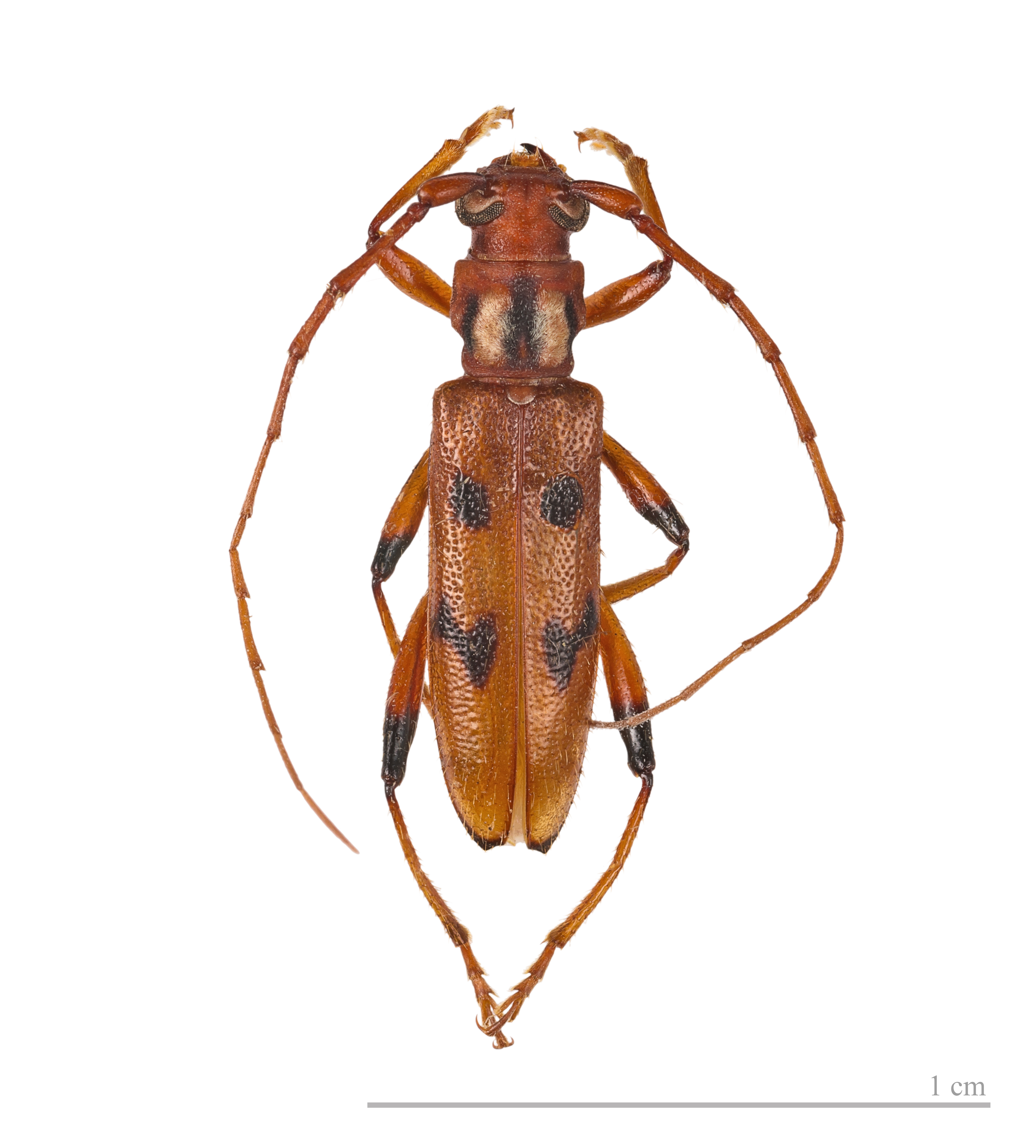
- Dubiefostola auricollis MHNT

Scientific classification
- Kingdom: Animalia
- Phylum: Arthropoda
- Class: Insecta
- Order: Coleoptera
- Suborder: Polyphaga
- Infraorder: Cucujiformia
- Family: Cerambycidae
- Genus: Dubiefostola
- Species: D. auricollis

Binomial name
- Dubiefostola auricollis Tavakilian & Monné, 1991

= Dubiefostola =

Dubiefostola auricollis

Genus of beetles

Dubiefostola auricollis is a species of beetle in the family Cerambycidae, the only species in the genus Dubiefostola.
