= Austrophanes =

Austrophanes robustum

Scientific classification
- Kingdom: Animalia
- Phylum: Arthropoda
- Clade: Pancrustacea
- Class: Insecta
- Order: Coleoptera
- Suborder: Polyphaga
- Infraorder: Cucujiformia
- Family: Cerambycidae
- Genus: Austrophanes; Chemsak & Linsley, 1963
- Species: A. robustum

Binomial name
- Austrophanes robustum Chemsak & Linsley, 1963

Genus of beetles

Austrophanes is a genus of beetles in the family Cerambycidae. It is monotypic, being represented by the single species Austrophanes robustum.
