= Hesperophanoschema =

Hesperophanoschema hirsutum

Scientific classification
- Kingdom: Animalia
- Phylum: Arthropoda
- Class: Insecta
- Order: Coleoptera
- Suborder: Polyphaga
- Infraorder: Cucujiformia
- Family: Cerambycidae
- Genus: Hesperophanoschema
- Species: H. hirsutum

Binomial name
- Hesperophanoschema hirsutum Zajciw, 1970

Genus of beetles

Hesperophanoschema hirsutum is a species of beetle in the family Cerambycidae, the only species in the genus Hesperophanoschema.
