= Nesophanes =

Nesophanes fulgidum

Scientific classification
- Kingdom: Animalia
- Phylum: Arthropoda
- Class: Insecta
- Order: Coleoptera
- Suborder: Polyphaga
- Infraorder: Cucujiformia
- Family: Cerambycidae
- Genus: Nesophanes
- Species: N. fulgidum

Binomial name
- Nesophanes fulgidum Chemsak, 1967

Genus of beetles

Nesophanes fulgidum is a species of beetle in the family Cerambycidae, the only species in the genus Nesophanes.
