= Osmidus =

Osmidus guttatus

Scientific classification
- Kingdom: Animalia
- Phylum: Arthropoda
- Clade: Pancrustacea
- Class: Insecta
- Order: Coleoptera
- Suborder: Polyphaga
- Infraorder: Cucujiformia
- Family: Cerambycidae
- Genus: Osmidus
- Species: O. guttatus

Binomial name
- Osmidus guttatus LeConte, 1873

Genus of beetles

Osmidus guttatus is a species of beetle in the family Cerambycidae, the only species in the genus Osmidus.
