= Zathecus =

Zathecus graphites

Scientific classification
- Kingdom: Animalia
- Phylum: Arthropoda
- Class: Insecta
- Order: Coleoptera
- Suborder: Polyphaga
- Infraorder: Cucujiformia
- Family: Cerambycidae
- Genus: Zathecus
- Species: Z. graphites

Binomial name
- Zathecus graphites Peringuey, 1896

Genus of beetles

Zathecus graphites is a species of beetle in the family Cerambycidae, the only species in the genus Zathecus.
