= Piezosecus =

Piezosecus tymaiuba

Scientific classification
- Kingdom: Animalia
- Phylum: Arthropoda
- Class: Insecta
- Order: Coleoptera
- Suborder: Polyphaga
- Infraorder: Cucujiformia
- Family: Cerambycidae
- Genus: Piezosecus
- Species: P. tymaiuba

Binomial name
- Piezosecus tymaiuba Martins & Galileo, 2003

Genus of beetles

Piezosecus tymaiuba is a species of beetle in the family Cerambycidae, the only species in the genus Piezosecus.
