= Thecladoris =

Thecladoris tylonotoides

Scientific classification
- Kingdom: Animalia
- Phylum: Arthropoda
- Class: Insecta
- Order: Coleoptera
- Suborder: Polyphaga
- Infraorder: Cucujiformia
- Family: Cerambycidae
- Genus: Thecladoris
- Species: T. tylonotoides

Binomial name
- Thecladoris tylonotoides Gounelle, 1909

Genus of beetles

Thecladoris tylonotoides is a species of beetle in the family Cerambycidae, the only species in the genus Thecladoris.
