= Paracorupella =

Paracorupella pallida

Scientific classification
- Kingdom: Animalia
- Phylum: Arthropoda
- Class: Insecta
- Order: Coleoptera
- Suborder: Polyphaga
- Infraorder: Cucujiformia
- Family: Cerambycidae
- Genus: Paracorupella
- Species: P. pallida

Binomial name
- Paracorupella pallida Martins & Galileo, 2009

Genus of beetles

Paracorupella pallida is a species of beetle in the family Cerambycidae, the only species in the genus Paracorupella.
