= Cetimaique =

Cetimaique trinodosa

Scientific classification
- Kingdom: Animalia
- Phylum: Arthropoda
- Class: Insecta
- Order: Coleoptera
- Suborder: Polyphaga
- Infraorder: Cucujiformia
- Family: Cerambycidae
- Genus: Cetimaique
- Species: C. trinodosa

Binomial name
- Cetimaique trinodosa Martins & Galileo, 1999

Genus of beetles

Cetimaique trinodosa is a species of beetle in the family Cerambycidae, the only species in the genus Cetimaique.
