= Brittonella =

Brittonella chardoni

Scientific classification
- Kingdom: Animalia
- Phylum: Arthropoda
- Class: Insecta
- Order: Coleoptera
- Suborder: Polyphaga
- Infraorder: Cucujiformia
- Family: Cerambycidae
- Genus: Brittonella
- Species: B. chardoni

Binomial name
- Brittonella chardoni Fisher, 1932

Genus of beetles

Brittonella chardoni is a species of beetle in the family Cerambycidae, the only species in the genus Brittonella.
