= A. maculata =

A. maculata may refer to:

- Acmadenia maculata, a flowering plant
- Acrolophus maculata, a Brazilian moth
- Actinacantha maculata, an orb-weaver spider
- Actodromas maculata, a migratory wader
- Acus maculata, an auger snail
- Aechmea maculata, an evergreen plant
- Aemene maculata, an Asian moth
- Aerides maculata, a cat's-tail orchid
- Afroneta maculata, a sheet weaver
- Agathiopsis maculata, an emerald moth
- Agroeca maculata, a liocranid sac spider
- Aguaytiella maculata, a neotropical harvestman
- Alaena maculata, a Congolese butterfly
- Alcis maculata, a geometer moth
- Alloclemensia maculata, a Japanese moth
- Allothereua maculata, an Australian centipede
- Allotoca maculata, a fish endemic to Mexico
- Aloe maculata, a succulent plant
- Alpinia maculata, a flowering plant
- Amblyeleotris maculata, a benthic goby
- Ameerega maculata, a poison dart frog
- Amoria maculata, a sea snail
- Amphiura maculata, a brittle star
- Aname maculata, a spider endemic to Australia
- Anaspis maculata, a false flower beetle
- Anchiale maculata, a stick insect
- Anguis maculata, a snake endemic to Sri Lanka
- Antona maculata, a South American moth
- Anyphaena maculata, an anyphaenid sac spider
- Apis maculata, a leaf-cutter bee
- Aplysia maculata, a sea hare
- Aranea maculata, a golden orb-web spider
- Aratinga maculata, a South American parrot
- Arca maculata, an ark clam
- Architectonica maculata, a staircase shell
- Arctia maculata, a European moth
- Arctosa maculata, a wolf spider
- Armina maculata, a sea slug
- Ashtoret maculata, a moon crab
- Australothele maculata, a funnel-web spider
- Austrobaileya maculata, a plant endemic to Queensland
