= A. batesi =

A. batesi may refer to:

- Abacetus batesi, a ground beetle
- Aerenea batesi, a longhorn beetle found in Brazil
- Alastos batesi, a longhorn beetle
- Anisopodus batesi, a longhorn beetle
- Apus batesi, Bates's swift, a bird found in western Africa
- Astylosternus batesi, the Benito River night frog, an amphibian found in Africa

== See also ==
- Antona batesii, a moth found in South America
