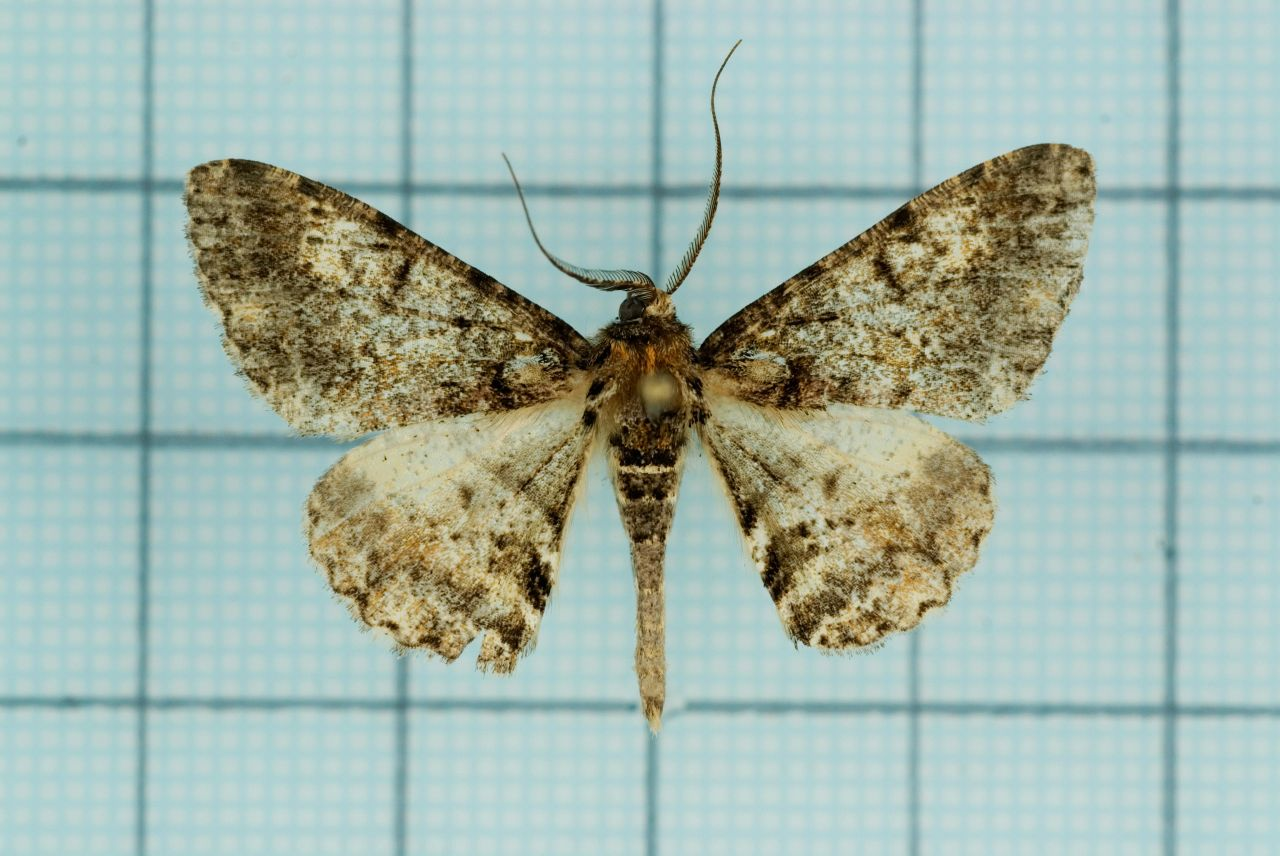

Scientific classification
- Kingdom: Animalia
- Phylum: Arthropoda
- Class: Insecta
- Order: Lepidoptera
- Family: Geometridae
- Subfamily: Ennominae
- Tribe: Boarmiini
- Genus: Alcis
- Species: A. taiwanovariegata

Binomial name
- Alcis taiwanovariegata Sato, 2008

Synonyms
- Boarmia subochrearia Wileman & South, 1917 (preoccupied by B. subochrearia Leech, 1897); Alcis variegata subochrearia

= Alcis taiwanovariegata =

Species of moth

Alcis taiwanovariegata is a moth of the family Geometridae. It is endemic to Taiwan where it is known from various localities, including Alishan.

== Taxonomy ==
The species was originally described as Boarmia subochrearia and was subsequently treated as a subspecies of Alcis variegata, before being resurrected under the replacement name Alcis taiwanovariegata.
