= Aerenea setifera =

Scientific classification
- Domain: Eukaryota
- Kingdom: Animalia
- Phylum: Arthropoda
- Class: Insecta
- Order: Coleoptera
- Suborder: Polyphaga
- Infraorder: Cucujiformia
- Family: Cerambycidae
- Genus: Aerenea
- Species: A. setifera

Binomial name
- Aerenea setifera Thomson, 1868

Species of beetle

Aerenea setifera is a species of beetle in the family Cerambycidae. It was described by Thomson in 1868. It is known from Brazil.
