= Aerenea bimaculata =

Scientific classification
- Domain: Eukaryota
- Kingdom: Animalia
- Phylum: Arthropoda
- Class: Insecta
- Order: Coleoptera
- Suborder: Polyphaga
- Infraorder: Cucujiformia
- Family: Cerambycidae
- Genus: Aerenea
- Species: A. bimaculata

Binomial name
- Aerenea bimaculata (Brèthes, 1920)

Synonyms
- Pythaides bimaculata Blackwelder, 1946; Pythaides bimaculatus Brèthes, 1920; Pythoides bimaculatus Breuning, 1961

Species of beetle

Aerenea bimaculata is a species of beetle in the family Cerambycidae. It was described by Juan Brèthes in 1920. It is known from Peru and Bolivia.
