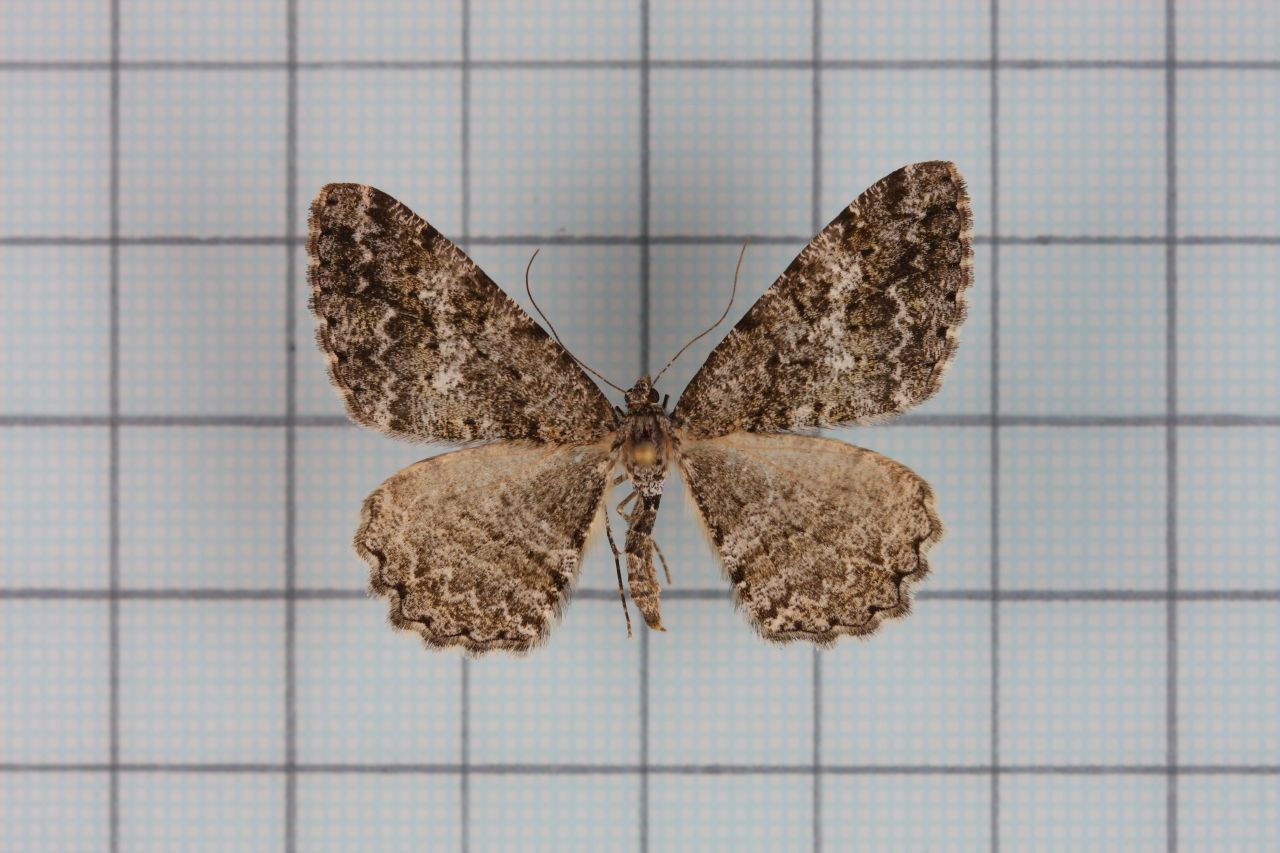
- Female

Scientific classification
- Kingdom: Animalia
- Phylum: Arthropoda
- Class: Insecta
- Order: Lepidoptera
- Family: Geometridae
- Subfamily: Ennominae
- Tribe: Boarmiini
- Genus: Alcis
- Species: A. taiwanensis

Binomial name
- Alcis taiwanensis Inoue, 1978

= Alcis taiwanensis =

Species of moth

Alcis taiwanensis is a species of moth in the family Geometridae. It is endemic to Taiwan.
