= Aerenea flavolineata =

Scientific classification
- Kingdom: Animalia
- Phylum: Arthropoda
- Class: Insecta
- Order: Coleoptera
- Suborder: Polyphaga
- Infraorder: Cucujiformia
- Family: Cerambycidae
- Genus: Aerenea
- Species: A. flavolineata

Binomial name
- Aerenea flavolineata Melzer, 1923

Species of beetle

Aerenea flavolineata is a species of beetle in the family Cerambycidae. It was described by Melzer in 1923. It is found in Argentina, Bolivia, Paraguay and Brazil.
