= Antona variana =

Scientific classification
- Domain: Eukaryota
- Kingdom: Animalia
- Phylum: Arthropoda
- Class: Insecta
- Order: Lepidoptera
- Superfamily: Noctuoidea
- Family: Erebidae
- Subfamily: Arctiinae
- Tribe: Lithosiini
- Genus: Antona
- Species: A. variana

Binomial name
- Antona variana (Butler, 1877)

Synonyms
- Josiodes variana Butler, 1877; Josiodes suffusa Draudt, 1918

Species of moth

Antona variana is a moth of the subfamily Arctiinae first described by Arthur Gardiner Butler in 1877. It is found in the Amazon basin.
