= Antona indecisa =

Scientific classification
- Domain: Eukaryota
- Kingdom: Animalia
- Phylum: Arthropoda
- Class: Insecta
- Order: Lepidoptera
- Superfamily: Noctuoidea
- Family: Erebidae
- Subfamily: Arctiinae
- Tribe: Lithosiini
- Genus: Antona
- Species: A. indecisa

Binomial name
- Antona indecisa (Butler, 1877)

Synonyms
- Josiodes indecisa Butler, 1877; Antona decisa Draudt, 1918

Species of moth

Antona indecisa is a moth of the subfamily Arctiinae first described by Arthur Gardiner Butler in 1877. It is found in the Amazon basin.
