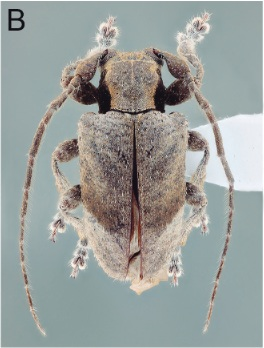

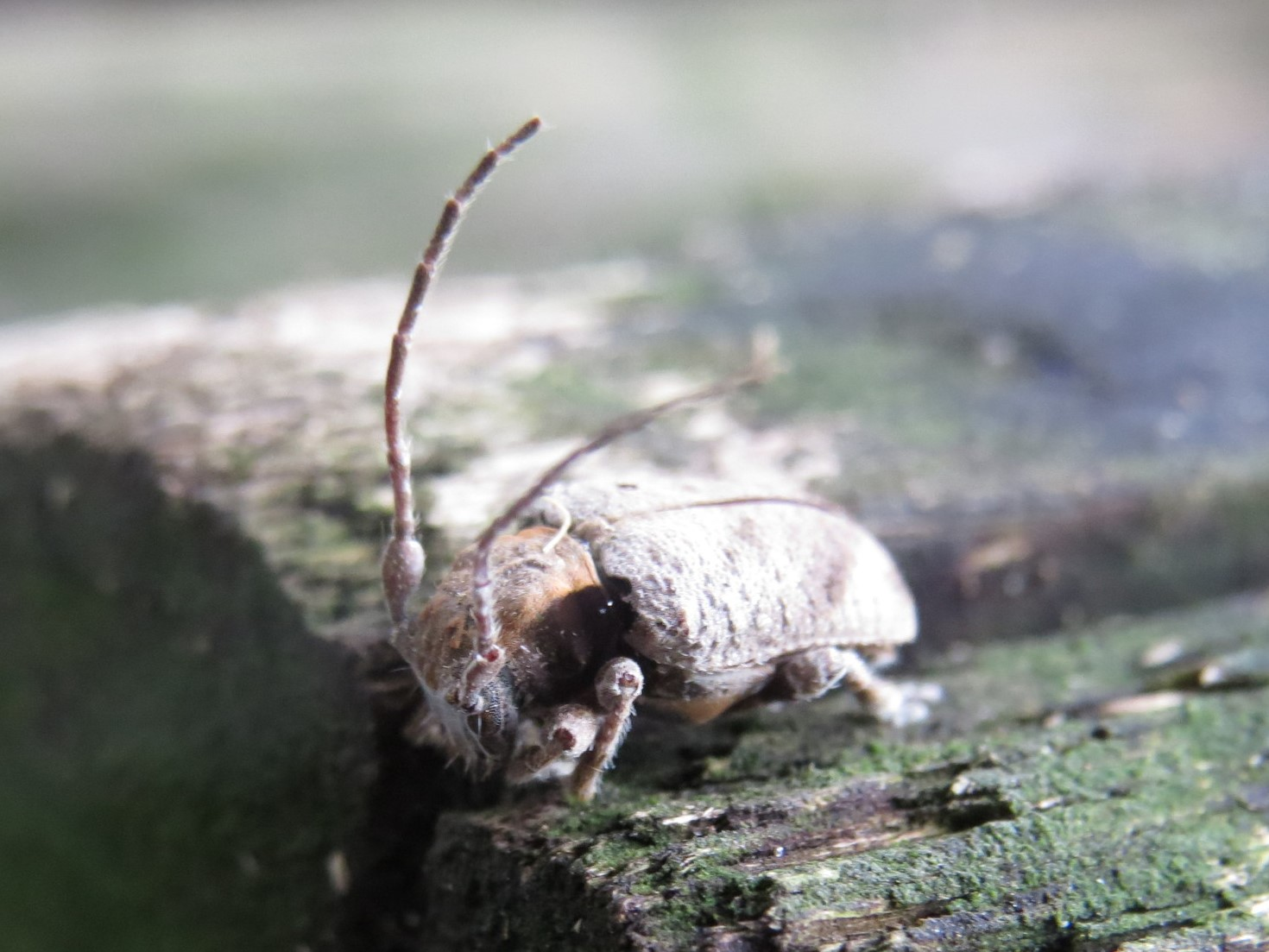

Scientific classification
- Kingdom: Animalia
- Phylum: Arthropoda
- Clade: Pancrustacea
- Class: Insecta
- Order: Coleoptera
- Suborder: Polyphaga
- Infraorder: Cucujiformia
- Family: Cerambycidae
- Genus: Aerenea
- Species: A. posticalis

Binomial name
- Aerenea posticalis Thomson, 1857

= Aerenea posticalis =

Species of beetle

Aerenea posticalis is a species of beetle in the family Cerambycidae. It was described by Thomson in 1857. It is known from Paraguay, Argentina and Brazil.
