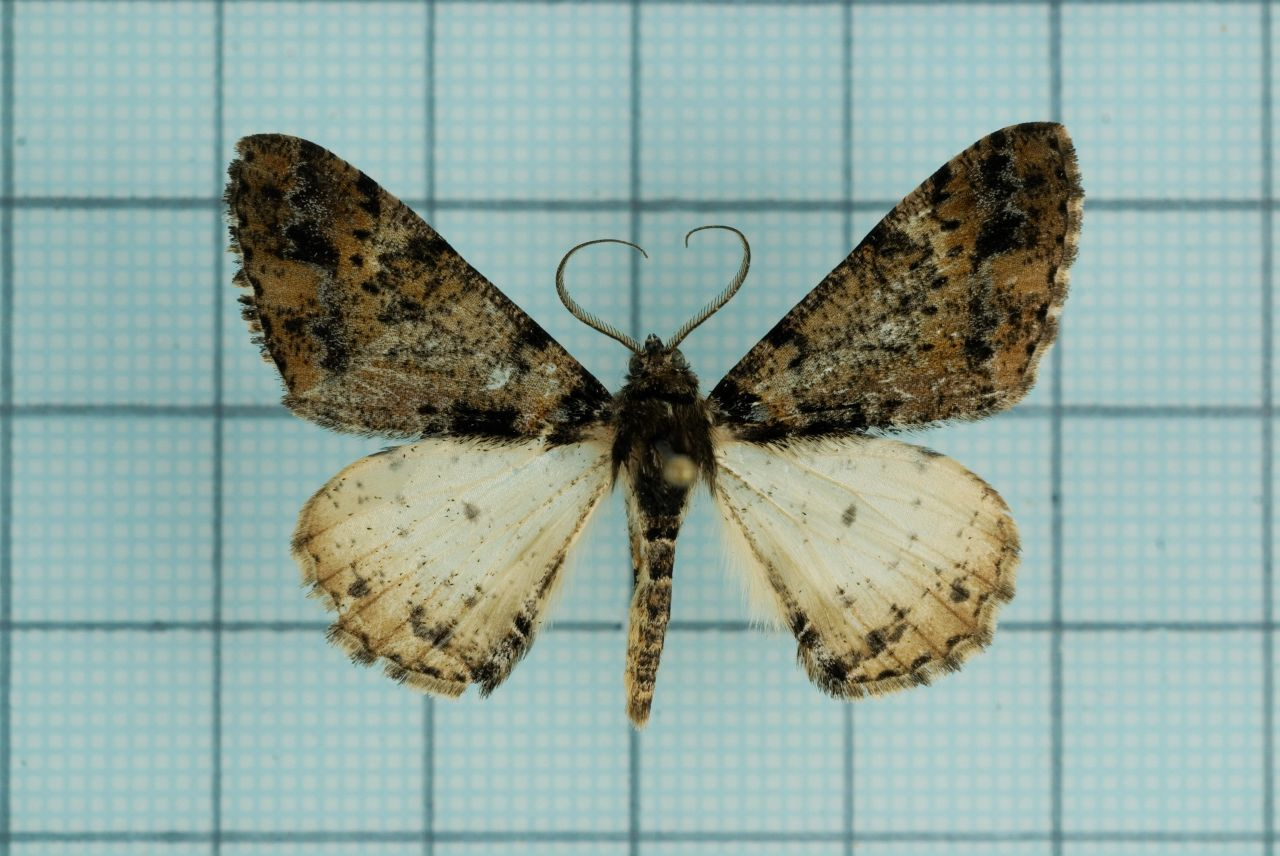

Scientific classification
- Domain: Eukaryota
- Kingdom: Animalia
- Phylum: Arthropoda
- Class: Insecta
- Order: Lepidoptera
- Family: Geometridae
- Subfamily: Ennominae
- Tribe: Boarmiini
- Genus: Alcis
- Species: A. semiusta

Binomial name
- Alcis semiusta (Bastelberger, 1909)

Synonyms
- Boarmia semiusta Bastelberger, 1909; Alcis nigronotata Wileman, 1912; Alcis bsasinotata Wileman, 1912

= Alcis semiusta =

Species of moth

Alcis semiusta is a moth of the family Geometridae. It is found in Taiwan.
