= Antona semicirculata =

Scientific classification
- Kingdom: Animalia
- Phylum: Arthropoda
- Class: Insecta
- Order: Lepidoptera
- Superfamily: Noctuoidea
- Family: Erebidae
- Subfamily: Arctiinae
- Tribe: Lithosiini
- Genus: Antona
- Species: A. semicirculata

Binomial name
- Antona semicirculata (Hampson, 1900)

Synonyms
- Josiodes semicirculata Hampson, 1900

Species of moth

Antona semicirculata is a moth of the subfamily Arctiinae first described by George Hampson in 1900. It is found in Ecuador and Bolivia.
