= Aerenea albilarvata =

Scientific classification
- Domain: Eukaryota
- Kingdom: Animalia
- Phylum: Arthropoda
- Class: Insecta
- Order: Coleoptera
- Suborder: Polyphaga
- Infraorder: Cucujiformia
- Family: Cerambycidae
- Genus: Aerenea
- Species: A. albilarvata

Binomial name
- Aerenea albilarvata Bates, 1866

Species of beetle

Aerenea albilarvata is a species of beetle in the family Cerambycidae. It was described by Henry Walter Bates in 1866. It is known from French Guiana, Brazil and Peru.
