= Antona toxaridia =

Scientific classification
- Domain: Eukaryota
- Kingdom: Animalia
- Phylum: Arthropoda
- Class: Insecta
- Order: Lepidoptera
- Superfamily: Noctuoidea
- Family: Erebidae
- Subfamily: Arctiinae
- Tribe: Lithosiini
- Genus: Antona
- Species: A. toxaridia

Binomial name
- Antona toxaridia (H. Druce, 1899)

Synonyms
- Josiodes toxaridia Druce, 1899

Species of moth

Antona toxaridia is a moth of the subfamily Arctiinae first described by Herbert Druce in 1899. It is found in Ecuador.
