= Aerenea alvaradoi =

Scientific classification
- Domain: Eukaryota
- Kingdom: Animalia
- Phylum: Arthropoda
- Class: Insecta
- Order: Coleoptera
- Suborder: Polyphaga
- Infraorder: Cucujiformia
- Family: Cerambycidae
- Genus: Aerenea
- Species: A. alvaradoi

Binomial name
- Aerenea alvaradoi Prosen, 1947

Species of beetle

Aerenea alvaradoi is a species of beetle in the family Cerambycidae. It was described by Prosen in 1947. It is known from Argentina.
