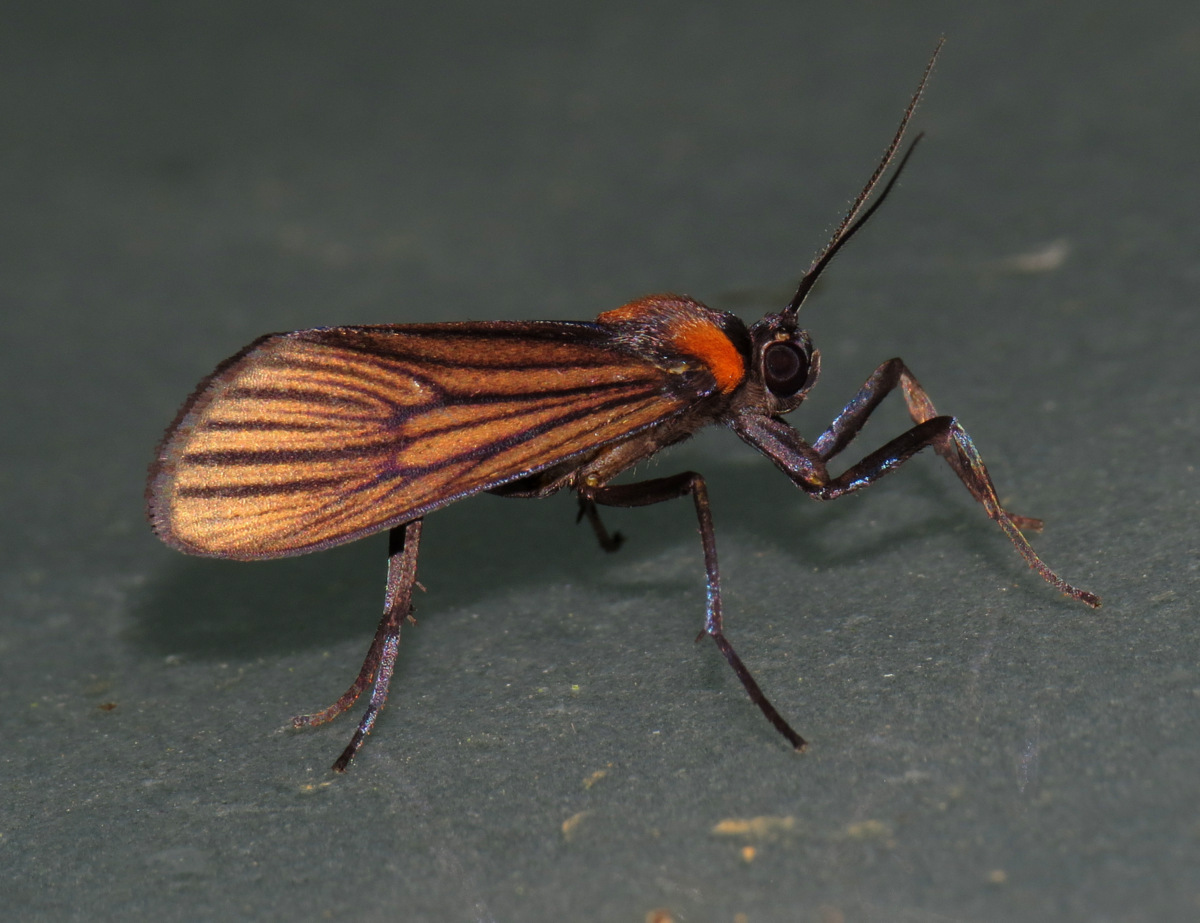
- Antona diffinis, Trinidad and Tobago

Scientific classification
- Kingdom: Animalia
- Phylum: Arthropoda
- Class: Insecta
- Order: Lepidoptera
- Superfamily: Noctuoidea
- Family: Erebidae
- Subfamily: Arctiinae
- Tribe: Lithosiini
- Genus: Antona
- Species: A. diffinis

Binomial name
- Antona diffinis (Walker, [1865])

Synonyms
- Pelochyta diffinis Walker, [1865]

= Antona diffinis =

Species of moth

Antona diffinis is a moth of the subfamily Arctiinae first described by Francis Walker in 1865. It is found in Trinidad, British Guiana and the Brazilian states of Pará and Espírito Santo.
