= Aerenea flavofasciculata =

Scientific classification
- Kingdom: Animalia
- Phylum: Arthropoda
- Class: Insecta
- Order: Coleoptera
- Suborder: Polyphaga
- Infraorder: Cucujiformia
- Family: Cerambycidae
- Genus: Aerenea
- Species: A. flavofasciculata

Binomial name
- Aerenea flavofasciculata Breuning, 1948

Species of beetle

Aerenea flavofasciculata is a species of beetle in the family Cerambycidae. It was described by Stephan von Breuning in 1948. It is known from Peru.
