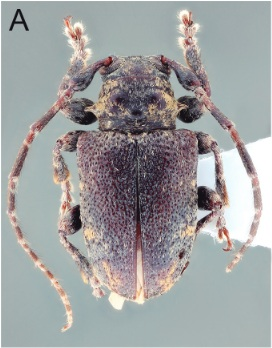

Scientific classification
- Kingdom: Animalia
- Phylum: Arthropoda
- Clade: Pancrustacea
- Class: Insecta
- Order: Coleoptera
- Suborder: Polyphaga
- Infraorder: Cucujiformia
- Family: Cerambycidae
- Genus: Aerenea
- Species: A. brunnea

Binomial name
- Aerenea brunnea Thomson, 1868

Synonyms
- Aerenea subnuda Melzer, 1923; Aerenea subnuda trinidadaensis Breuning, 1980

= Aerenea brunnea =

Species of beetle

Aerenea brunnea is a species of beetle in the family Cerambycidae. It was described by Thomson in 1868. It is known from Argentina, Colombia, Brazil, Suriname, French Guiana, Panama, Peru, Bolívia, Paraguay, Venezuela, and Trinidad and Tobago.
