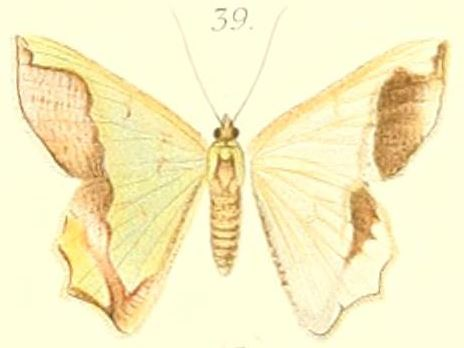

Scientific classification
- Kingdom: Animalia
- Phylum: Arthropoda
- Class: Insecta
- Order: Lepidoptera
- Family: Geometridae
- Subfamily: Geometrinae
- Genus: Agathiopsis; Warren, 1896

= Agathiopsis =

Genus of geometer moths

Agathiopsis is a genus of moths in the family Geometridae. The species of this genus are found in Australia and Papua New Guinea.

== Species ==
- Agathiopsis amphibola
- Agathiopsis angustifascia
- Agathiopsis basipuncta Warren, 1896
- Agathiopsis benedicta
- Agathiopsis leptocosma
- Agathiopsis maculata Warren, 1896
- Agathiopsis occidentis
- Agathiopsis subflavata Warren, 1905
- Agathiopsis talaseensis
- Agathiopsis unanimis
