= Aerenea apicalis =

Scientific classification
- Kingdom: Animalia
- Phylum: Arthropoda
- Class: Insecta
- Order: Coleoptera
- Suborder: Polyphaga
- Infraorder: Cucujiformia
- Family: Cerambycidae
- Genus: Aerenea
- Species: A. apicalis

Binomial name
- Aerenea apicalis Melzer, 1923

Synonyms
- Aerenea compacta Breuning, 1948; Aerenea compacta m. mediofasciata Breuning, 1948; Cognataerenea mediofasciata Breuning, 1971

Species of beetle

Aerenea apicalis is a species of beetle in the family Cerambycidae. It was described by Melzer in 1923. It is known from Brazil.
