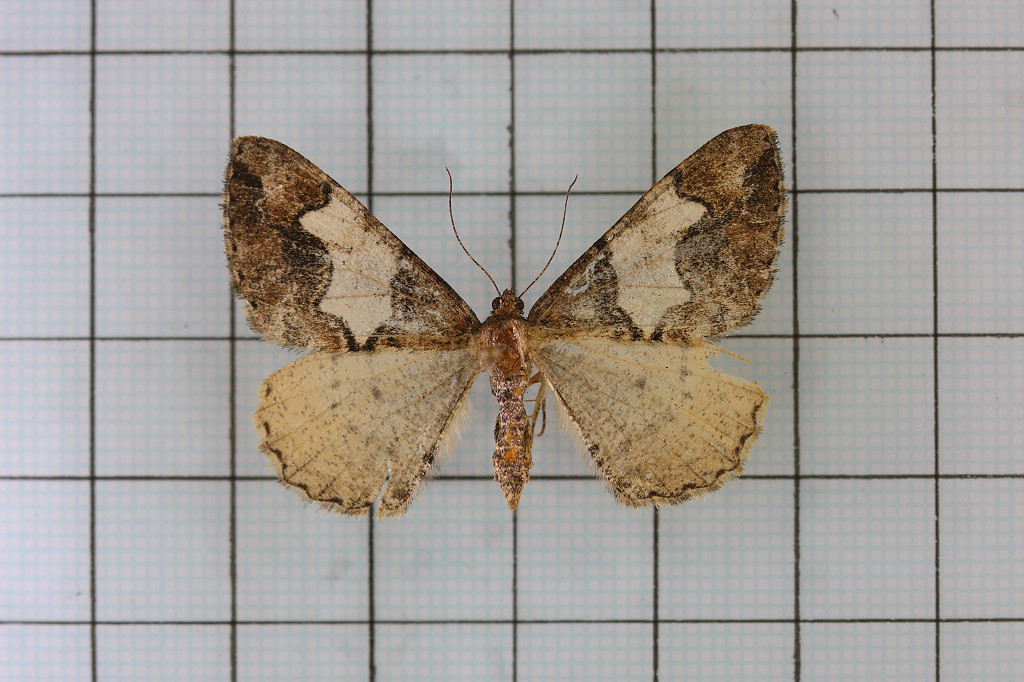

Scientific classification
- Kingdom: Animalia
- Phylum: Arthropoda
- Clade: Pancrustacea
- Class: Insecta
- Order: Lepidoptera
- Family: Geometridae
- Subfamily: Ennominae
- Tribe: Boarmiini
- Genus: Alcis
- Species: A. tayulina

Binomial name
- Alcis tayulina Sato, 1990

= Alcis tayulina =

Species of moth

Alcis tayulina is a moth of the family Geometridae. It is found in Taiwan.
