= Aerenea periscelifera =

Scientific classification
- Kingdom: Animalia
- Phylum: Arthropoda
- Class: Insecta
- Order: Coleoptera
- Suborder: Polyphaga
- Infraorder: Cucujiformia
- Family: Cerambycidae
- Genus: Aerenea
- Species: A. periscelifera

Binomial name
- Aerenea periscelifera Thomson, 1868

Synonyms
- Aerenea albosetosa Breuning, 1971; Aerenea columbiana Breuning, 1948

Species of beetle

Aerenea periscelifera is a species of beetle in the family Cerambycidae. It was described by Thomson in 1868. It is known from Colombia and Brazil.
