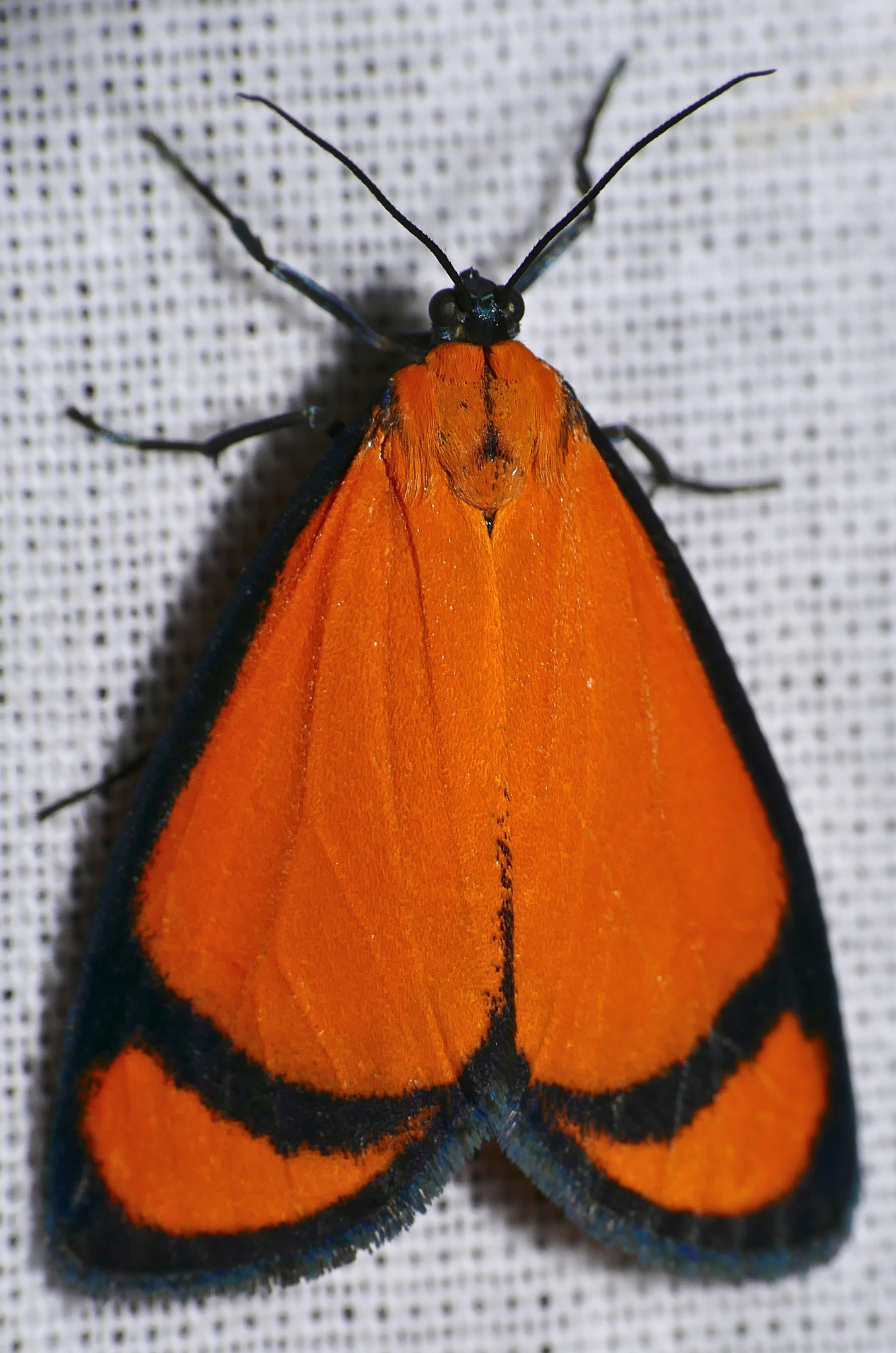
- Antona repleta, French Guiana

Scientific classification
- Kingdom: Animalia
- Phylum: Arthropoda
- Class: Insecta
- Order: Lepidoptera
- Superfamily: Noctuoidea
- Family: Erebidae
- Subfamily: Arctiinae
- Genus: Antona
- Species: A. repleta

Binomial name
- Antona repleta (Walker, 1854)

Synonyms
- Josia repleta Walker, 1854; Antona striata Draudt, 1918

= Antona repleta =

Species of moth

Antona repleta is a moth of the subfamily Arctiinae first described by Francis Walker in 1854. It is found in the Amazon basin.
