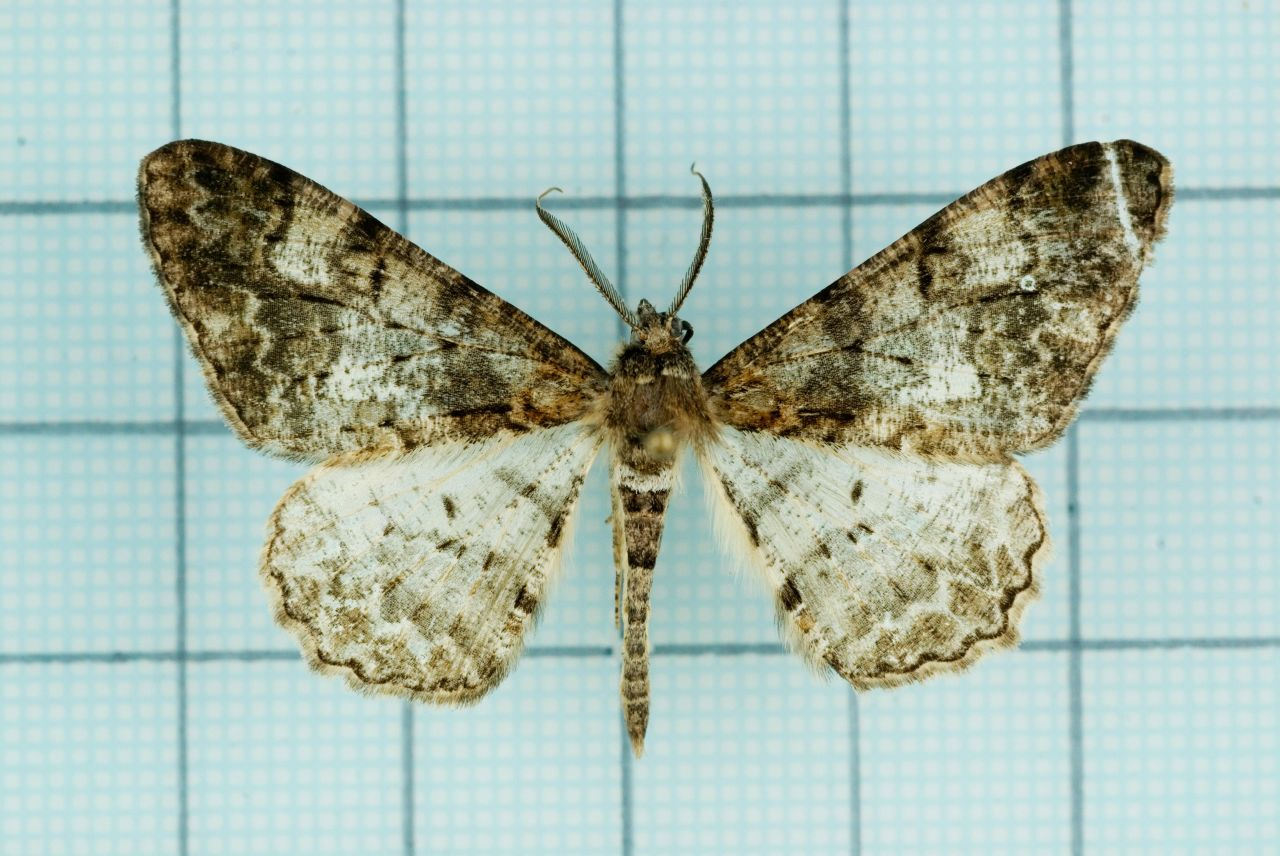
- Alcis admissaria undularia
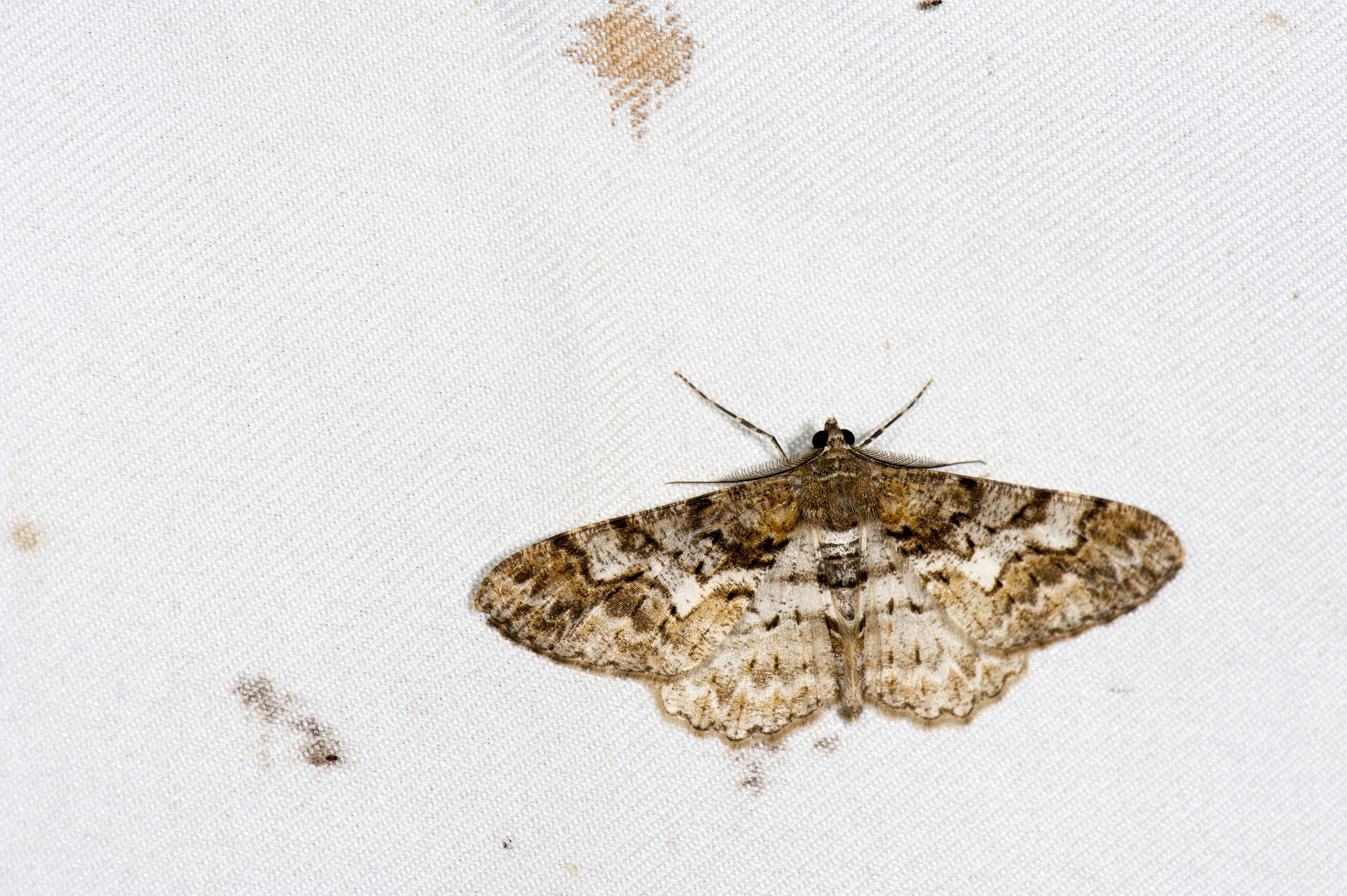

Scientific classification
- Domain: Eukaryota
- Kingdom: Animalia
- Phylum: Arthropoda
- Class: Insecta
- Order: Lepidoptera
- Family: Geometridae
- Subfamily: Ennominae
- Tribe: Boarmiini
- Genus: Alcis
- Species: A. admissaria

Binomial name
- Alcis admissaria Guenée, 1858

= Alcis admissaria =

Species of moth

Alcis admissaria is a moth of the family Geometridae described by Achille Guenée in 1858. It is found in Afghanistan, China (including Tibet), India, and Taiwan .

== Subspecies ==
- Alcis admissaria admissaria
- Alcis admissaria undularia Wileman, 1911
