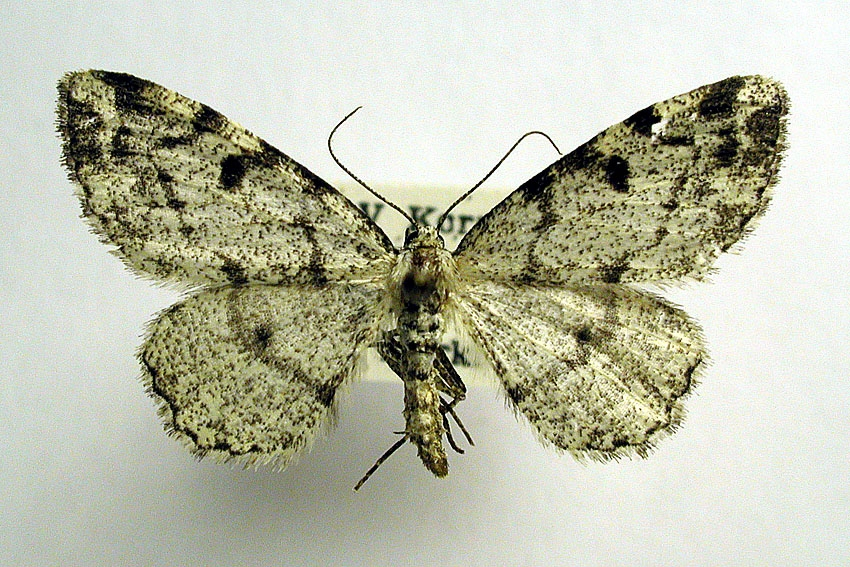

Scientific classification
- Kingdom: Animalia
- Phylum: Arthropoda
- Class: Insecta
- Order: Lepidoptera
- Family: Geometridae
- Subfamily: Ennominae
- Tribe: Boarmiini
- Genus: Alcis
- Species: A. jubata

Binomial name
- Alcis jubata (Thunberg, 1788)

Synonyms
- Phalaena jubata Thunberg, 1788; Alcis jubatus

= Alcis jubata =

Species of moth

Alcis jubata, the dotted carpet, is a moth of the family Geometridae. The species was first described by Carl Peter Thunberg in 1788. It is found in central Europe, Scandinavia and northern Italy.Thence across the Palearctic to Altai, Sajan, Transbaikalia, Mongolia, Amur and Primorye. Subspecies A. j. melanonota Prout, 1930 is found in Sakhalin, the Kuriles, and Japan.

The wingspan is 28–33 mm. The forewings of males and females are whitish to whitish grey or green-grey ground colour. The interior and exterior crosslines are wavy, often intermittent broader. The central line is indicated only by blackish dots and partly by a very weak line. Very clearly, the black discal spot and a black stain of the costa is at the front end of the outer crossline. Further, most not so sharply defined stains are formed in the apical area of the postdiscal area. Occasionally, the subterminal line at least in the front half of the wing is indicated. A marginal line is usually visible both on the forewings and hindwings. There is a clear line on the hindwings, and a discal fleck. The forewings and hindwings are dusted dark. Therefore, some specimens seem very dark.

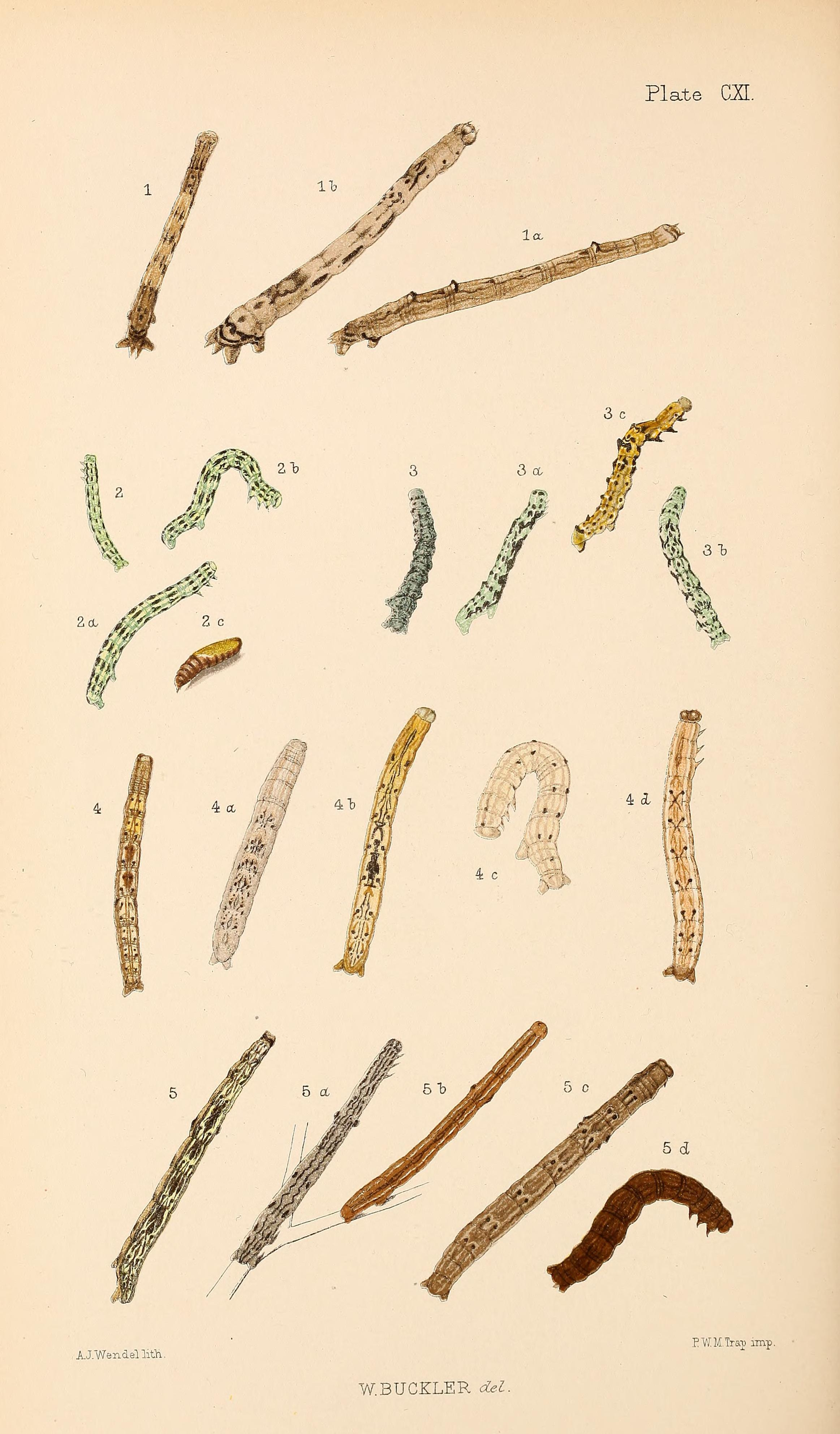
Larvae in various stages Figures 2, 2a, 2b

Adults are on wing from the end of July to August in one generation.

The larvae feed on lichens, including Usnea barbata. It overwinters as a larva.

== Subspecies ==
- Alcis jubata jubata
- Alcis jubata melanonota (Prout, 1930)
