= Antona sexmaculata =

Scientific classification
- Domain: Eukaryota
- Kingdom: Animalia
- Phylum: Arthropoda
- Class: Insecta
- Order: Lepidoptera
- Superfamily: Noctuoidea
- Family: Erebidae
- Subfamily: Arctiinae
- Tribe: Lithosiini
- Genus: Antona
- Species: A. sexmaculata

Binomial name
- Antona sexmaculata (Butler, 1877)

Synonyms
- Josiodes sexmaculata Butler, 1877

Species of moth

Antona sexmaculata is a moth of the subfamily Arctiinae first described by Arthur Gardiner Butler in 1877. It is found in the Amazon basin.
