= Aerenea panamensis =

Scientific classification
- Domain: Eukaryota
- Kingdom: Animalia
- Phylum: Arthropoda
- Class: Insecta
- Order: Coleoptera
- Suborder: Polyphaga
- Infraorder: Cucujiformia
- Family: Cerambycidae
- Genus: Aerenea
- Species: A. panamensis

Binomial name
- Aerenea panamensis Martins & Galileo, 2010

Species of beetle

Aerenea panamensis is a species of beetle in the family Cerambycidae. It was described by Martins and Galileo in 2010. It is known from Panama.
