= Antona myrrha =

Scientific classification
- Domain: Eukaryota
- Kingdom: Animalia
- Phylum: Arthropoda
- Class: Insecta
- Order: Lepidoptera
- Superfamily: Noctuoidea
- Family: Erebidae
- Subfamily: Arctiinae
- Tribe: Lithosiini
- Genus: Antona
- Species: A. myrrha

Binomial name
- Antona myrrha (Cramer, [1775])

Synonyms
- Geometra myrrha Cramer, [1775]; Noctua fulvia Clerck, 1764 (not Donovan, 1805)

Species of moth

Antona myrrha is a moth of the subfamily Arctiinae first described by Pieter Cramer in 1775. It is found in Suriname.
