= Antona abscissa =

Scientific classification
- Kingdom: Animalia
- Phylum: Arthropoda
- Clade: Pancrustacea
- Class: Insecta
- Order: Lepidoptera
- Superfamily: Noctuoidea
- Family: Erebidae
- Subfamily: Arctiinae
- Tribe: Lithosiini
- Genus: Antona
- Species: A. abscissa

Binomial name
- Antona abscissa (Hübner, 1827)

Synonyms
- Hypocrita abscissa Hübner, 1827; Josia fixa Walker, 1854; Josiodes inconstans Butler, 1877

Species of moth

Antona abscissa is a moth of the subfamily Arctiinae first described by Jacob Hübner in 1827. It is found in the Amazon basin.
