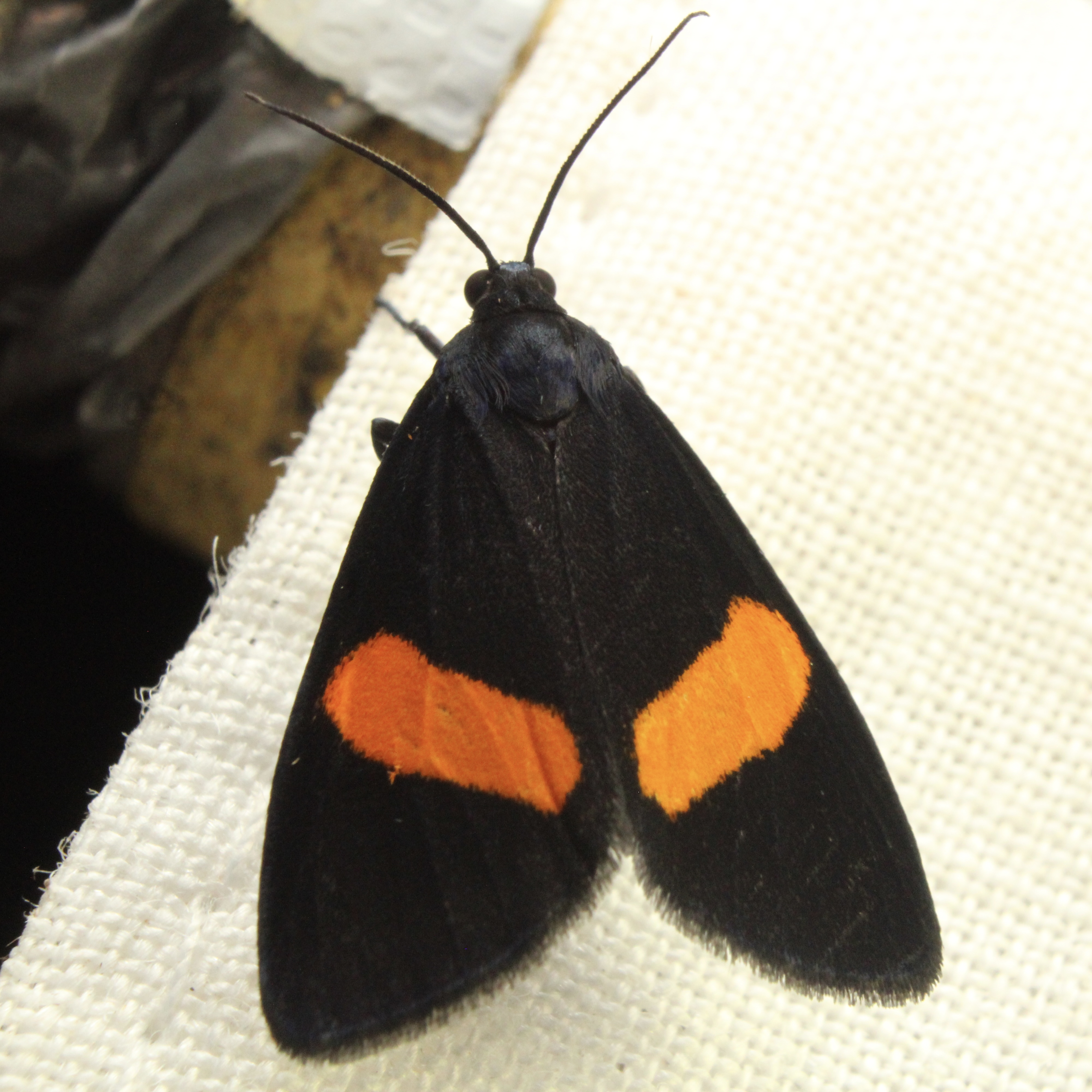

Scientific classification
- Kingdom: Animalia
- Phylum: Arthropoda
- Clade: Pancrustacea
- Class: Insecta
- Order: Lepidoptera
- Superfamily: Noctuoidea
- Family: Erebidae
- Subfamily: Arctiinae
- Tribe: Lithosiini
- Genus: Antona
- Species: A. generans

Binomial name
- Antona generans (Walker, 1854)

Synonyms
- Josia generans Walker, 1854; Josiodes obscura Butler, 1877

= Antona generans =

Species of moth

Antona generans is a moth of the subfamily Arctiinae first described by Francis Walker in 1854. It is found in the Amazon basin.
