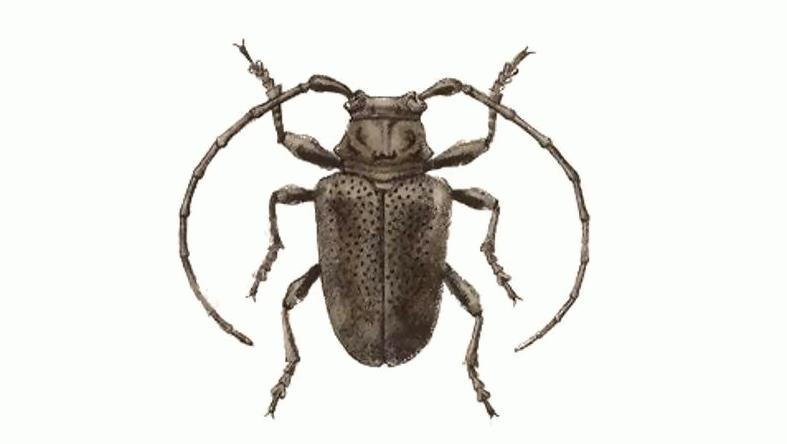
- Aerenea impetiginosa

Scientific classification
- Domain: Eukaryota
- Kingdom: Animalia
- Phylum: Arthropoda
- Class: Insecta
- Order: Coleoptera
- Suborder: Polyphaga
- Infraorder: Cucujiformia
- Family: Cerambycidae
- Tribe: Compsosomatini
- Genus: Aerenea; Thomson, 1857

= Aerenea =

Genus of beetles

Aerenea is a genus of longhorn beetles of the subfamily Lamiinae.

== Species ==
- A. aglaia Monné, 1980
- A. albilarvata Bates, 1866
- A. alvaradoi Prosen, 1947
- A. annulata Monné, 1980
- A. antennalis Breuning, 1948
- A. apicalis Melzer, 1923
- A. batesi Monné, 1980
- A. bimaculata (Brèthes, 1920)
- A. brunnea Thomson, 1868
- A. ecuadoriensis Breuning, 1947
- A. flavofasciculata Breuning, 1948
- A. flavolineata Melzer, 1923
- A. gounellei Monné, 1980
- A. humerolineata Breuning, 1980
- A. impetiginosa Thomson, 1868
- A. occulta Monné, 1980
- A. panamensis Martins & Galileo, 2010
- A. periscelifera Thomson, 1868
- A. posticalis Thomson, 1857
- A. punctatostriata (Breuning, 1948)
- A. quadriplagiata (Boheman, 1859)
- A. robusta Monné, 1980
- A. setifera Thomson, 1868
- A. subcostata Melzer, 1932
- A. subimpetiginosa Breuning, 1948
- A. sulcicollis Melzer, 1932
- A. transversefasciata Breuning, 1974
- A. trigona Pascoe, 1858
- A. tuberculata Monné, 1980
