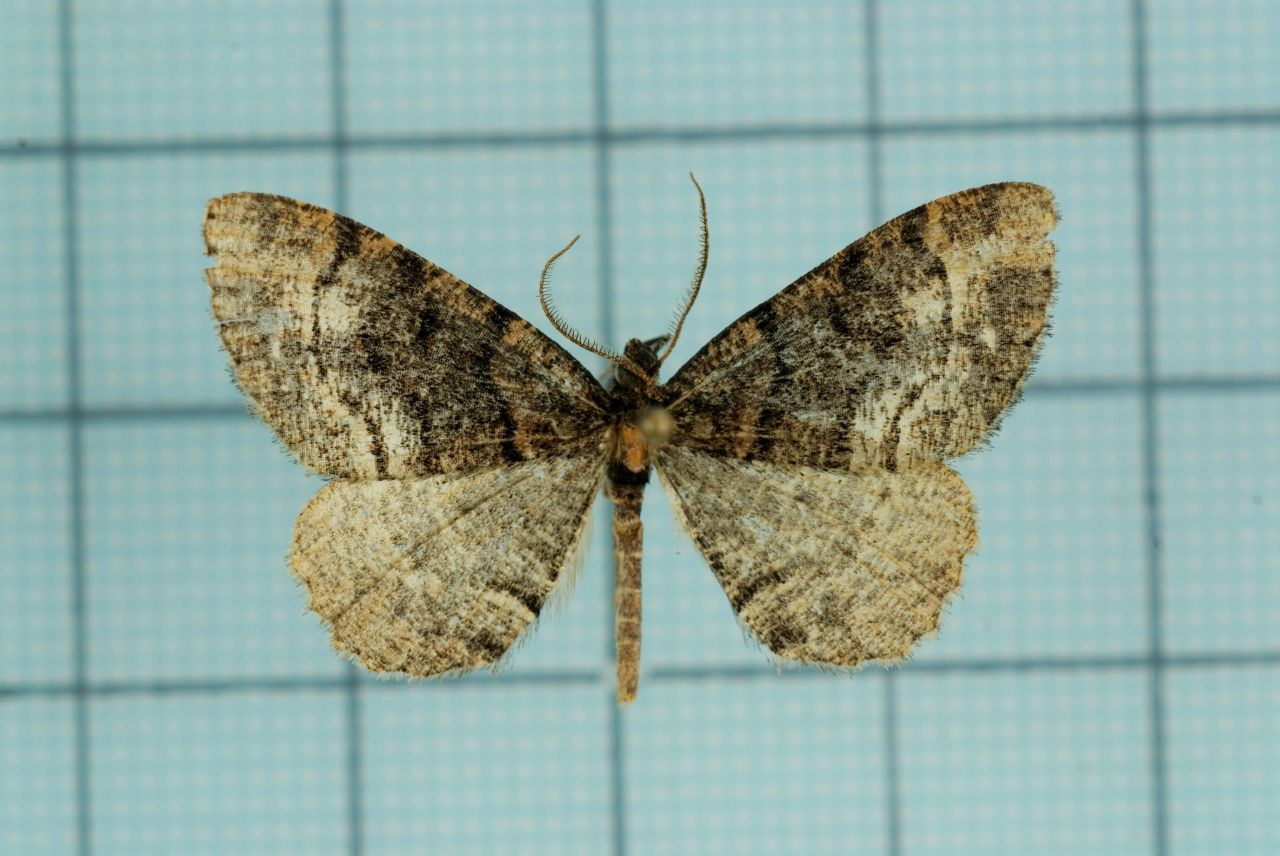

Scientific classification
- Domain: Eukaryota
- Kingdom: Animalia
- Phylum: Arthropoda
- Class: Insecta
- Order: Lepidoptera
- Family: Geometridae
- Subfamily: Ennominae
- Tribe: Boarmiini
- Genus: Alcis
- Species: A. nubeculosa

Binomial name
- Alcis nubeculosa Bastelberger, 1909

= Alcis nubeculosa =

Species of moth

Alcis nubeculosa is a moth of the family Geometridae. It is found in Taiwan.
