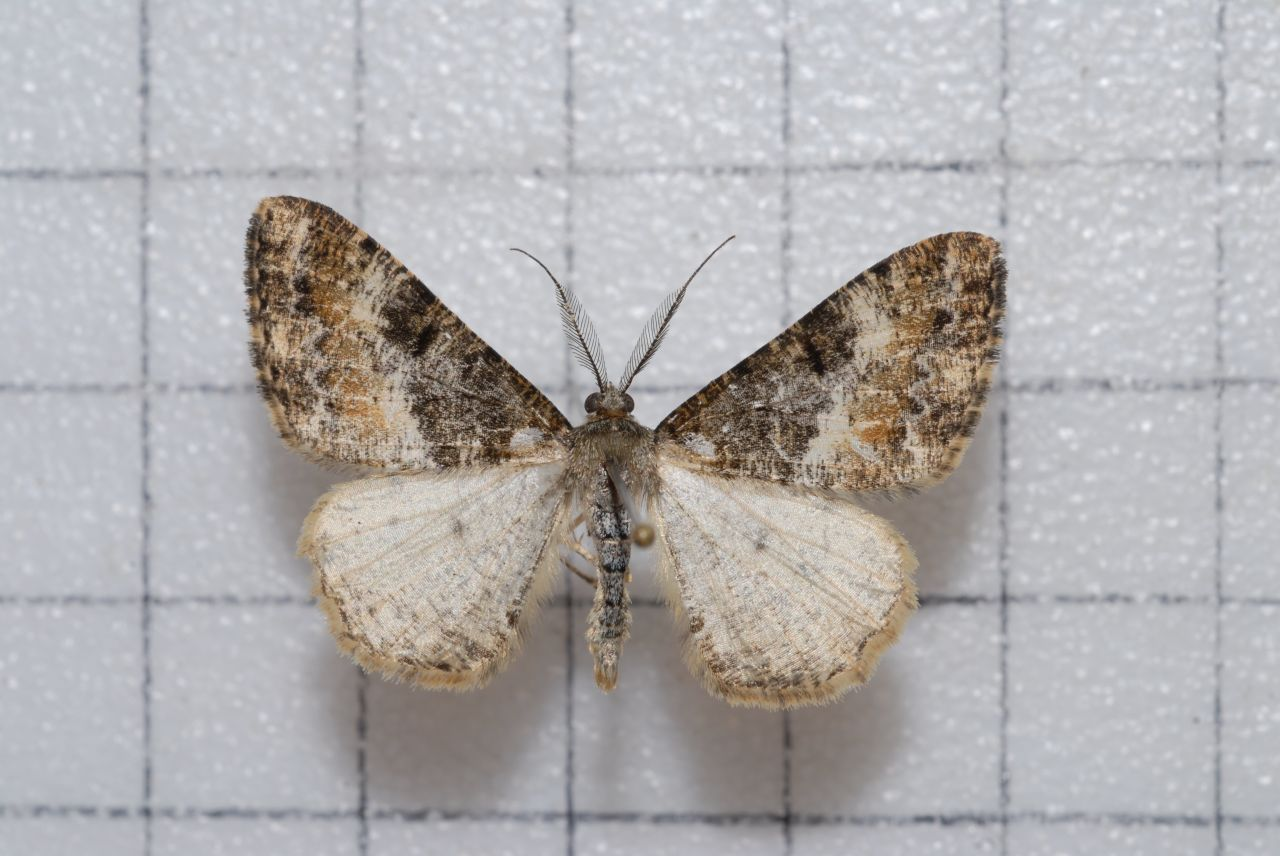

Scientific classification
- Kingdom: Animalia
- Phylum: Arthropoda
- Clade: Pancrustacea
- Class: Insecta
- Order: Lepidoptera
- Family: Geometridae
- Subfamily: Ennominae
- Tribe: Boarmiini
- Genus: Alcis
- Species: A. scortea

Binomial name
- Alcis scortea (Bastelberger, 1909)

= Alcis scortea =

Species of moth

Alcis scortea is a moth of the family Geometridae. It is found in Taiwan.

The wingspan is 26–33 mm. Adults are on wing in February.
