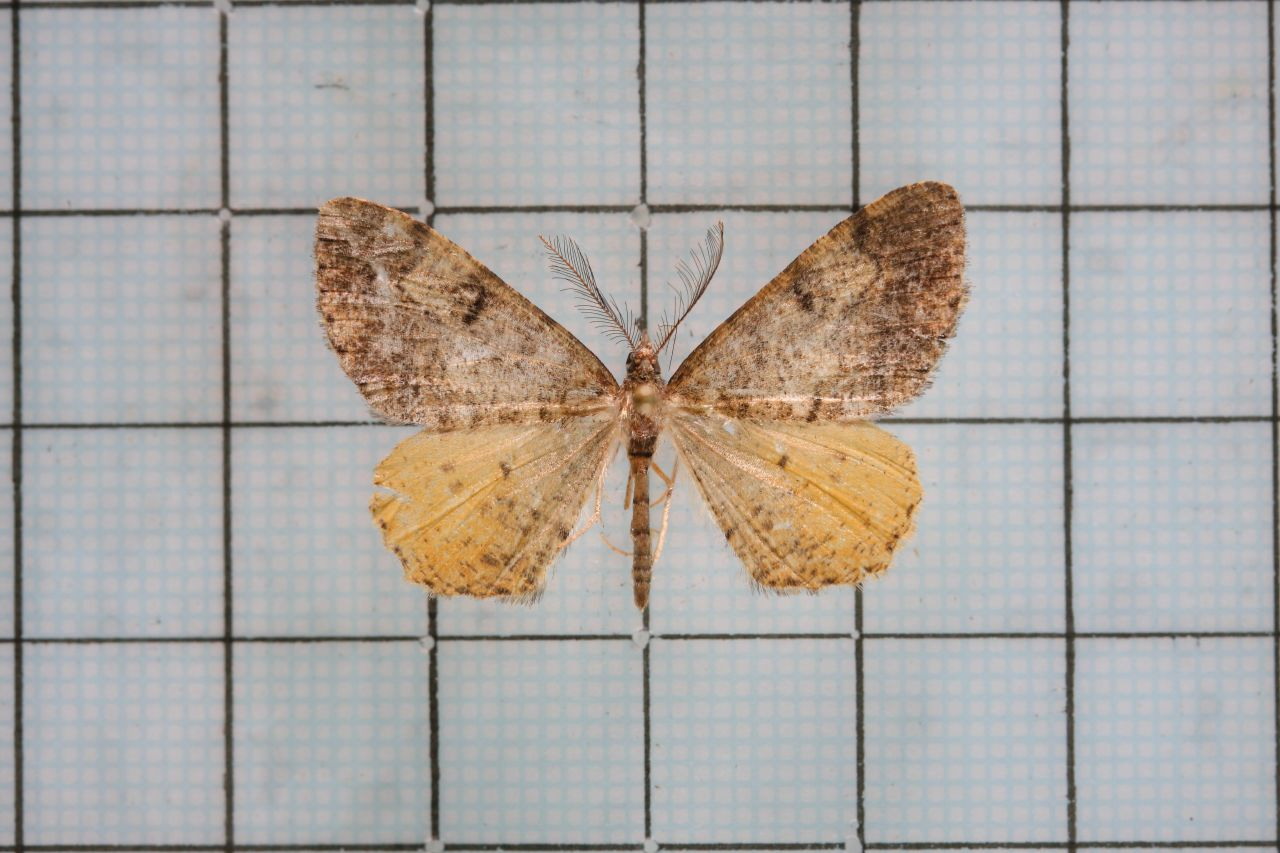
- Alcis postlurida undularia

Scientific classification
- Kingdom: Animalia
- Phylum: Arthropoda
- Class: Insecta
- Order: Lepidoptera
- Family: Geometridae
- Subfamily: Ennominae
- Tribe: Boarmiini
- Genus: Alcis
- Species: A. postlurida

Binomial name
- Alcis postlurida Inoue, 1978

= Alcis postlurida =

Species of moth

Alcis postlurida is a moth of the family Geometridae. It is found in south-east Asia, including China, Bhutan and Taiwan.

== Subspecies ==
- Alcis postlurida postlurida
- Alcis postlurida undularia Inoue, 1978 (Taiwan)
