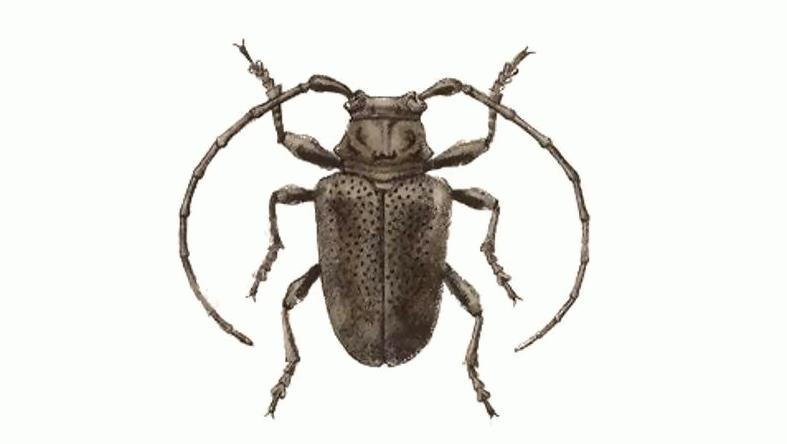

Scientific classification
- Domain: Eukaryota
- Kingdom: Animalia
- Phylum: Arthropoda
- Class: Insecta
- Order: Coleoptera
- Suborder: Polyphaga
- Infraorder: Cucujiformia
- Family: Cerambycidae
- Genus: Aerenea
- Species: A. impetiginosa

Binomial name
- Aerenea impetiginosa Thomson, 1868

= Aerenea impetiginosa =

Species of beetle

Aerenea impetiginosa is a species of beetle in the family Cerambycidae. It was described by Thomson in 1868. It is known from Guatemala, Honduras, Colombia, Costa Rica, Mexico, Nicaragua, Panama, Peru, and Venezuela.
