= Antona peruviana =

Scientific classification
- Domain: Eukaryota
- Kingdom: Animalia
- Phylum: Arthropoda
- Class: Insecta
- Order: Lepidoptera
- Superfamily: Noctuoidea
- Family: Erebidae
- Subfamily: Arctiinae
- Tribe: Lithosiini
- Genus: Antona
- Species: A. peruviana

Binomial name
- Antona peruviana (Schaus, 1892)

Synonyms
- Brycea peruviana Schaus, 1892

Species of moth

Antona peruviana is a moth of the subfamily Arctiinae first described by Schaus in 1892. It is found in Peru.
