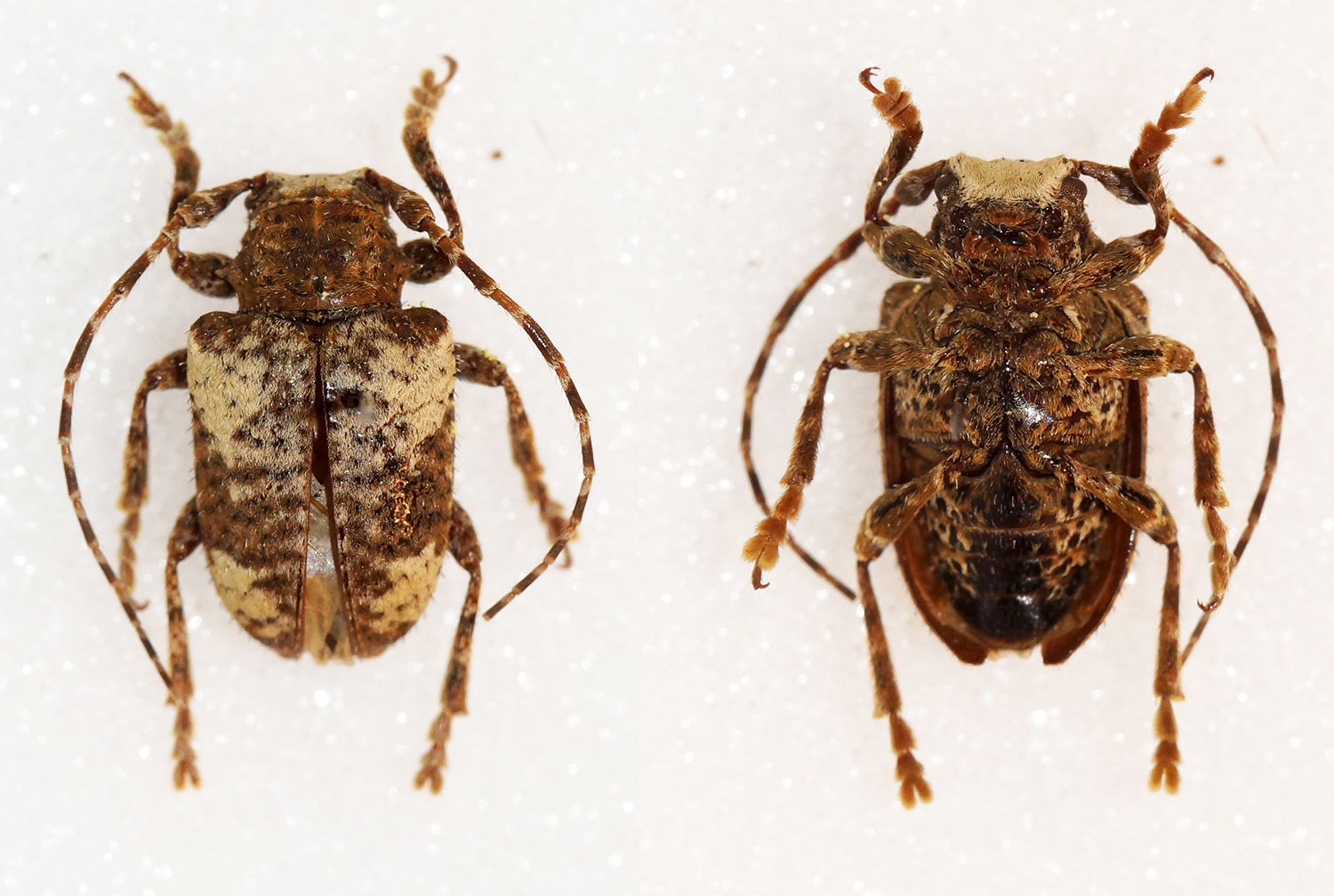

Scientific classification
- Domain: Eukaryota
- Kingdom: Animalia
- Phylum: Arthropoda
- Class: Insecta
- Order: Coleoptera
- Suborder: Polyphaga
- Infraorder: Cucujiformia
- Family: Cerambycidae
- Genus: Aerenea
- Species: A. quadriplagiata

Binomial name
- Aerenea quadriplagiata (Boheman, 1859)

Synonyms
- Aerenea pulchella Gemminger & Harold, 1873; Aerenea quadriplagiatum Bruch, 1912; Compsosoma albigena Burmeister, 1865; Compsosoma albigenum Gemminger & Harold, 1873; Compsosoma quadriplagiata Boheman, 1859; Compsosoma quadriplagiatum Gemminger & Harold, 1873

= Aerenea quadriplagiata =

Species of beetle

Aerenea quadriplagiata is a species of beetle in the family Cerambycidae. It was described by Carl Henrik Boheman in 1859. It is known from Argentina, Brazil, Bolivia, Paraguay, and Uruguay.
