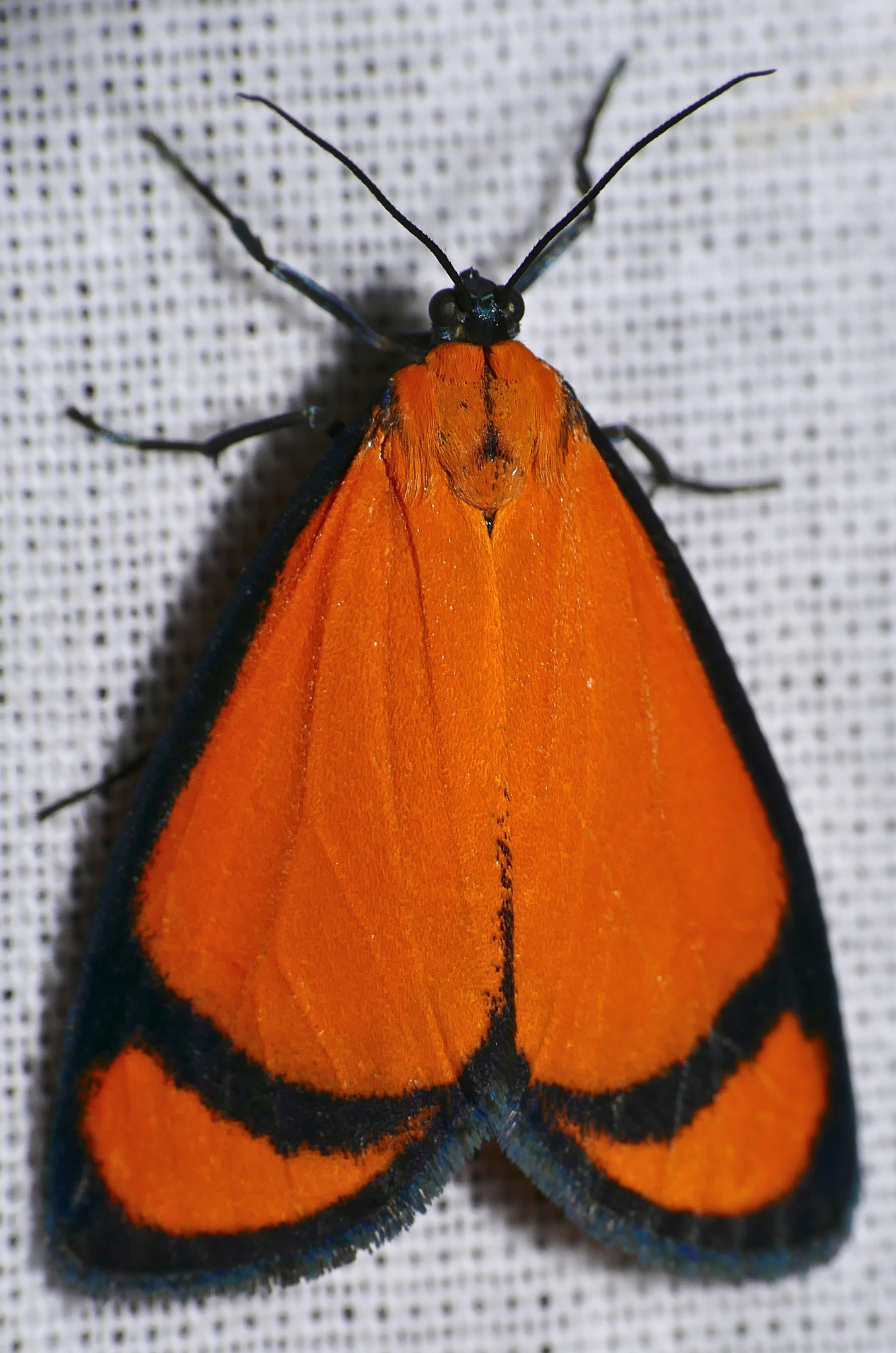
- Antona repleta, French Guiana

Scientific classification
- Kingdom: Animalia
- Phylum: Arthropoda
- Class: Insecta
- Order: Lepidoptera
- Superfamily: Noctuoidea
- Family: Erebidae
- Subfamily: Arctiinae
- Tribe: Lithosiini
- Genus: Antona; Walker, 1854

Synonyms
- Josiodes Felder, 1874

= Antona =

Genus of moths

Antona is a genus of tiger and lichen moths in the family Erebidae. There are more than 20 described species in Antona, found in Central and South America.

== Species ==
These 25 species belong to the genus Antona:

- Antona abscissa Hübner, 1827
- Antona batesii Felder, 1874
- Antona clavata Walker, 1854
- Antona caerulescens Hampson, 1900
- Antona diffinis Walker, 1864
- Antona erythromelas Walker, 1854
- Antona fallax Butler, 1877
- Antona generans Walker, 1854
- Antona immutata Walker, 1854
- Antona indecisa Butler, 1877
- Antona intensa Rothschild, 1912
- Antona mutans Walker, 1854
- Antona mutata Walker, 1854
- Antona myrrha Cramer, 1775
- Antona nigrobasalis Rothschild, 1912
- Antona peruviana Schaus, 1892
- Antona repleta Walker, 1854
- Antona semicirculata Hampson, 1900
- Antona sexmaculata Butler, 1877
- Antona suapurensis Rothschild, 1912
- Antona subluna Walker, 1854
- Antona tenuifascia Hampson, 1900
- Antona toxaridia Druce, 1899
- Antona variana Butler, 1877
