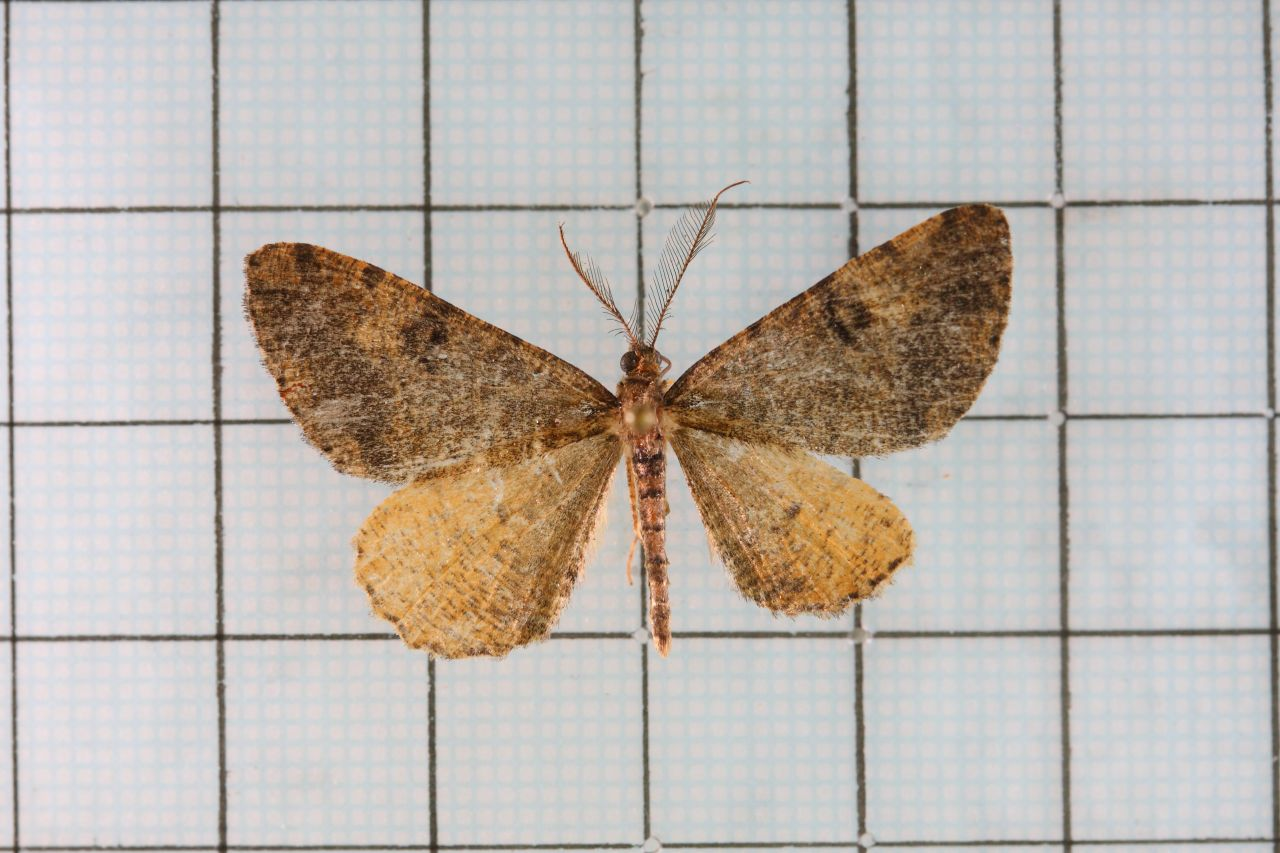
- Male
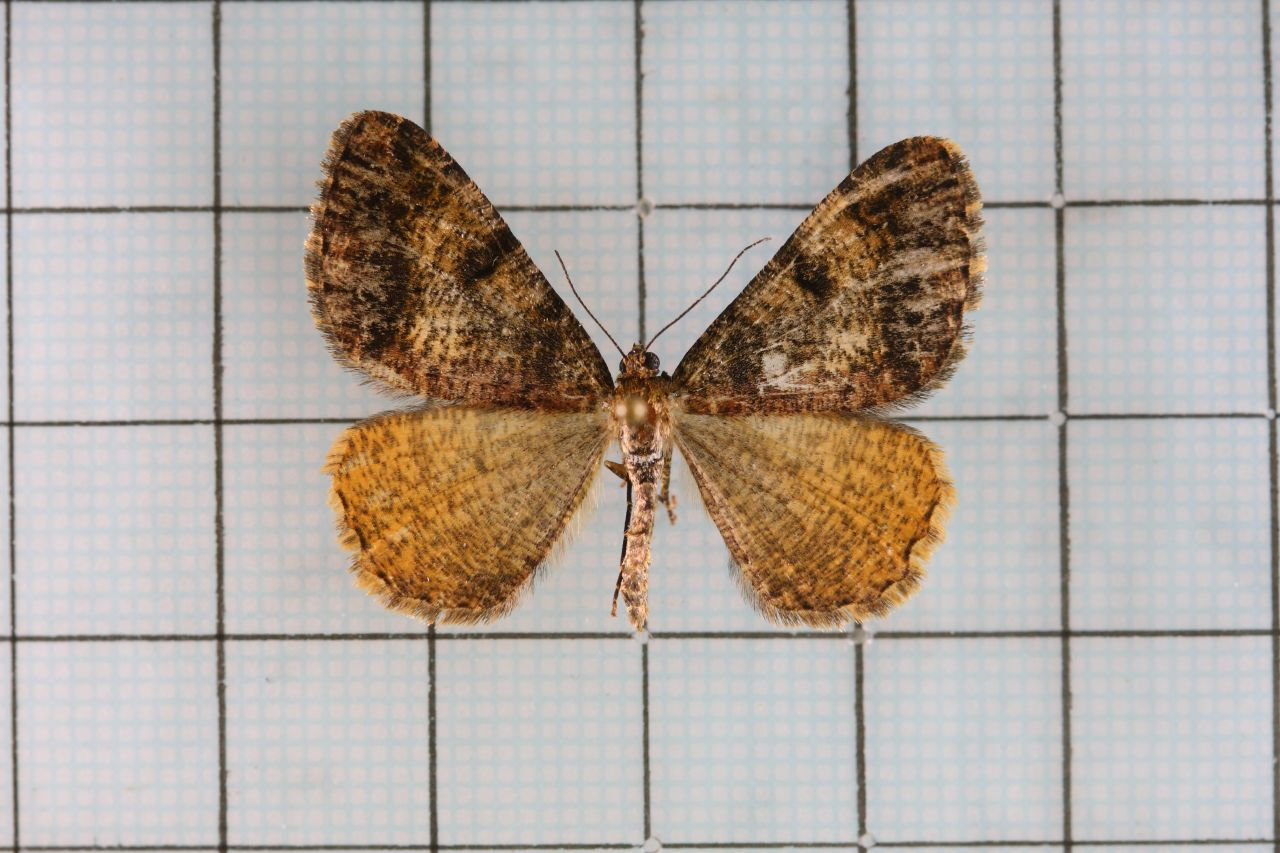
- Female

Scientific classification
- Kingdom: Animalia
- Phylum: Arthropoda
- Class: Insecta
- Order: Lepidoptera
- Family: Geometridae
- Subfamily: Ennominae
- Tribe: Boarmiini
- Genus: Alcis
- Species: A. rubicunda

Binomial name
- Alcis rubicunda Bastelberger, 1909

Synonyms
- Alcis consors Bastelberger, 1909; Alcis macularia Wileman, 1912

= Alcis rubicunda =

Species of moth

Alcis rubicunda is a moth of the family Geometridae. It is found in Taiwan.

The wingspan is 32–40 mm.
