= Aerenea robusta =

Scientific classification
- Domain: Eukaryota
- Kingdom: Animalia
- Phylum: Arthropoda
- Class: Insecta
- Order: Coleoptera
- Suborder: Polyphaga
- Infraorder: Cucujiformia
- Family: Cerambycidae
- Genus: Aerenea
- Species: A. robusta

Binomial name
- Aerenea robusta Monné, 1980

Species of beetle

Aerenea robusta is a species of beetle in the family Cerambycidae. It was described by Monné in 1980. It is known from Paraguay.
