= Antona subluna =

Scientific classification
- Kingdom: Animalia
- Phylum: Arthropoda
- Class: Insecta
- Order: Lepidoptera
- Superfamily: Noctuoidea
- Family: Erebidae
- Subfamily: Arctiinae
- Tribe: Lithosiini
- Genus: Antona
- Species: A. subluna

Binomial name
- Antona subluna Walker, 1854

Synonyms
- Antona major Draudt, 1919

Species of moth

Antona subluna is a moth of the subfamily Arctiinae first described by Francis Walker in 1854. It is found in Rio de Janeiro, Brazil.
