= Antona intensa =

Scientific classification
- Domain: Eukaryota
- Kingdom: Animalia
- Phylum: Arthropoda
- Class: Insecta
- Order: Lepidoptera
- Superfamily: Noctuoidea
- Family: Erebidae
- Subfamily: Arctiinae
- Tribe: Lithosiini
- Genus: Antona
- Species: A. intensa

Binomial name
- Antona intensa (Rothschild, 1912)

Synonyms
- Josiodes intensa Rothschild, 1912

Species of moth

Antona intensa is a moth of the subfamily Arctiinae. It is found in Suriname.
