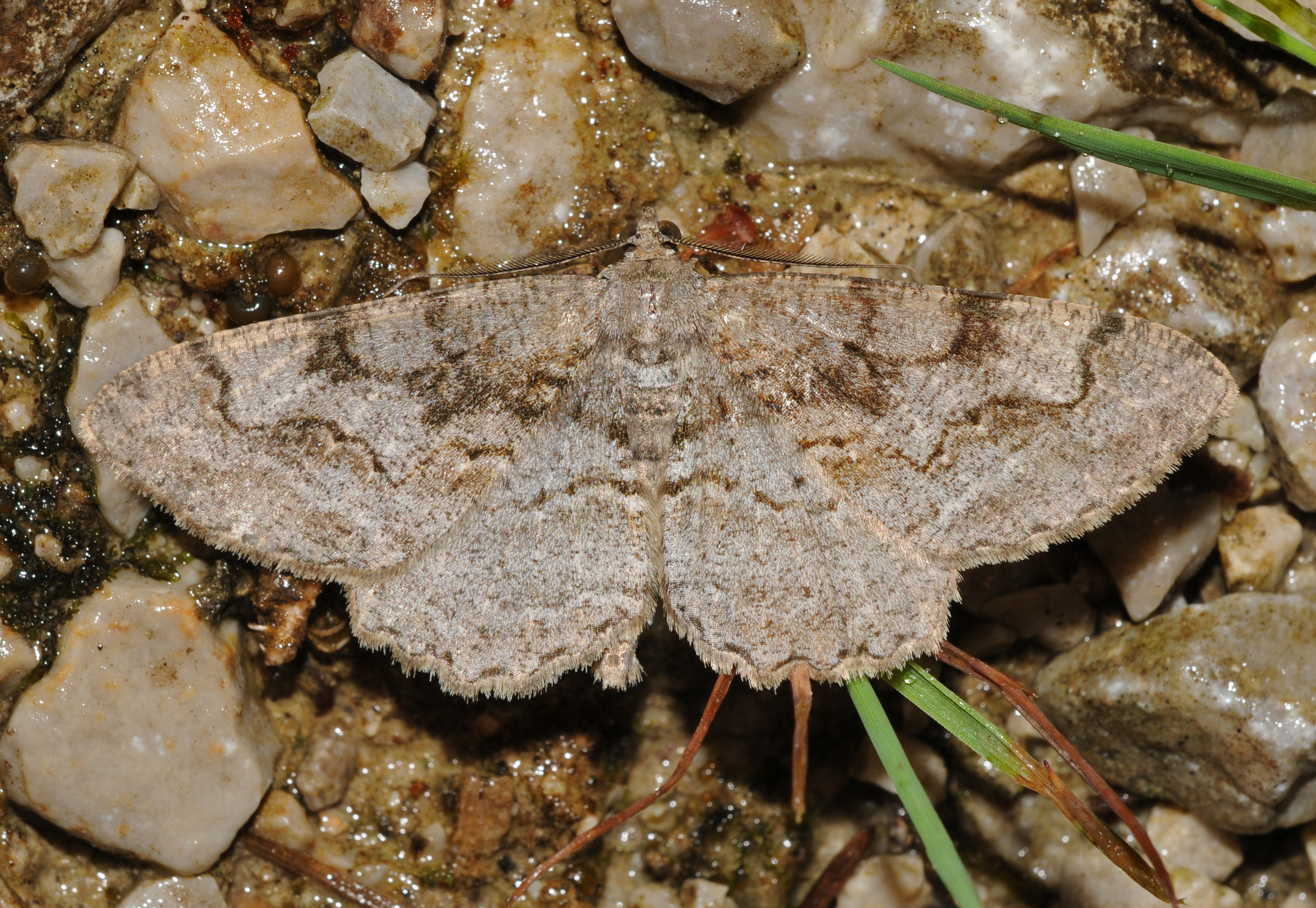
- Alcis repandata

Scientific classification
- Kingdom: Animalia
- Phylum: Arthropoda
- Class: Insecta
- Order: Lepidoptera
- Family: Geometridae
- Subfamily: Ennominae
- Tribe: Boarmiini
- Genus: Alcis; Curtis, 1826

Synonyms
- Alcisca Wehrli, 1943; Dictyodea Wehrli, 1934; Poecilalcis Warren, 1893

= Alcis (moth) =

Genus of geometer moths

Alcis is a genus of moths in the family Geometridae described by John Curtis in 1826.

== Species ==
- Alcis aagostigma (Prout, 1927)
- Alcis admissaria Guenée, 1858
- Alcis albilinea Sato, 1993 (India)
- Alcis angulifera (Butler, 1878)
- Alcis anmashanensis Sato, 1999
- Alcis arizana Wileman, 1911
- Alcis bachmaensis Sato, 2008
- Alcis bastelbergeri (Hirschke, 1908)
- Alcis bornemaculata Sato, 2005
- Alcis caucasica (Wehrli, 1928)
- Alcis chiangmaiensis Sato, 1991
- Alcis cockaynei (Prout, 1916)
- Alcis colorifera (Prout, 1916)
- Alcis convariata (Prout, 1935) (Java)
- Alcis decussata Moore, 1867
- Alcis depravata (Staudinger, 1892)
- Alcis ectogramma (Wehrli, 1934)
- Alcis eupithecioides (West, 1929)
- Alcis extinctaria (Eversmann, 1851)
- Alcis granitaria (Moore, 1888)
- Alcis hemiphanes (Prout, 1925)
- Alcis herbuloti Orhant, 2000
- Alcis hodeberti Herbulot, 1987
- Alcis hyberniata Bastelberger, 1909
- Alcis imbecilis (Moore, 1888)
- Alcis jubata (Thunberg, 1788) – dotted carpet
- Alcis leucophaea D. S. Fletcher, 1961
- Alcis lobbichleri D. S. Fletcher, 1961
- Alcis lutzi Sato, 2008
- Alcis macroclarata Sato, 1993
- Alcis maculata (Moore, [1868])
- Alcis manfredi Sato, 2005
- Alcis medialbifera Inoue, 1972
- Alcis micromaculata Sato, 2005
- Alcis moesta (Butler, 1881)
- Alcis nigridorsaria (Guenée, 1857)
- Alcis nigrifasciata (Warren, 1893)
- Alcis nigrolineata (Wileman & South, 1917)
- Alcis nilgirica Hampson, 1895
- Alcis nobilitaria (Staudinger, 1892)
- Alcis nubeculosa (Bastelberger, 1909)
- Alcis paghmana Wiltshire, 1967
- Alcis pallens Inoue, 1978
- Alcis pammicra (L. B. Prout, 1925)
- Alcis paraclarata Sato, 1993
- Alcis paukstadti Sato, 2008
- Alcis periphracta (Prout, 1926)
- Alcis picata (Butler, 1881)
- Alcis plebeia Wileman, 1912
- Alcis polysticta (Hampson, 1902)
- Alcis postlurida Inoue, 1978
- Alcis praevariegata (Prout, 1926)
- Alcis pryeraria (Leech, 1897)
- Alcis repandata (Linnaeus, 1758) – mottled beauty
- Alcis rubicunda Bastelberger, 1909
- Alcis scortea (Bastelberger, 1909)
- Alcis semialba (Moore, 1888)
- Alcis semiatrata Sato, 2008
- Alcis semiclarata Walker, 1862
- Alcis semiochrea Prout, 1917
- Alcis semiopaca Sato & M. Wang, 2008
- Alcis semipullata (Prout, 1925)
- Alcis semiusta (Bastelberger, 1909)
- Alcis shivae Wiltshire, 1967
- Alcis songarica (Alphéraky, 1883)
- Alcis subochrearia (Leech, 1897) (western China)
- Alcis subpunctata Wileman, 1911
- Alcis subrepandata Staudinger, 1897
- Alcis subtincta Warren, 1897
- Alcis taiwanensis Inoue, 1978
- Alcis taiwanovariegata (Wileman & South, 1917)
- Alcis tayulina Sato, 1990
- Alcis tricotaria (Felder, 1867)
- Alcis variegata (Moore, 1888)
- Alcis xuei Sato & M. Wang, 2005
