= Antona mutata =

Scientific classification
- Kingdom: Animalia
- Phylum: Arthropoda
- Class: Insecta
- Order: Lepidoptera
- Superfamily: Noctuoidea
- Family: Erebidae
- Subfamily: Arctiinae
- Tribe: Lithosiini
- Genus: Antona
- Species: A. mutata

Binomial name
- Antona mutata (Walker, 1854)

Synonyms
- Josia mutata Walker, 1854

Species of moth

Antona mutata is a moth of the subfamily Arctiinae first described by Francis Walker in 1854. It is found in the Amazon basin.
