= Antona clavata =

Scientific classification
- Kingdom: Animalia
- Phylum: Arthropoda
- Class: Insecta
- Order: Lepidoptera
- Superfamily: Noctuoidea
- Family: Erebidae
- Subfamily: Arctiinae
- Tribe: Lithosiini
- Genus: Antona
- Species: A. clavata

Binomial name
- Antona clavata (Walker, 1854)

Synonyms
- Josiodes clavata Walker, 1854

Species of moth

Antona clavata is a moth of the subfamily Arctiinae first described by Francis Walker in 1854. It is found in the Amazon basin.
