= Aerenea subcostata =

Scientific classification
- Kingdom: Animalia
- Phylum: Arthropoda
- Class: Insecta
- Order: Coleoptera
- Suborder: Polyphaga
- Infraorder: Cucujiformia
- Family: Cerambycidae
- Genus: Aerenea
- Species: A. subcostata

Binomial name
- Aerenea subcostata Melzer, 1932

Species of beetle

Aerenea subcostata is a species of beetle in the family Cerambycidae. It was described by Melzer in 1932. It is known from Brazil.
