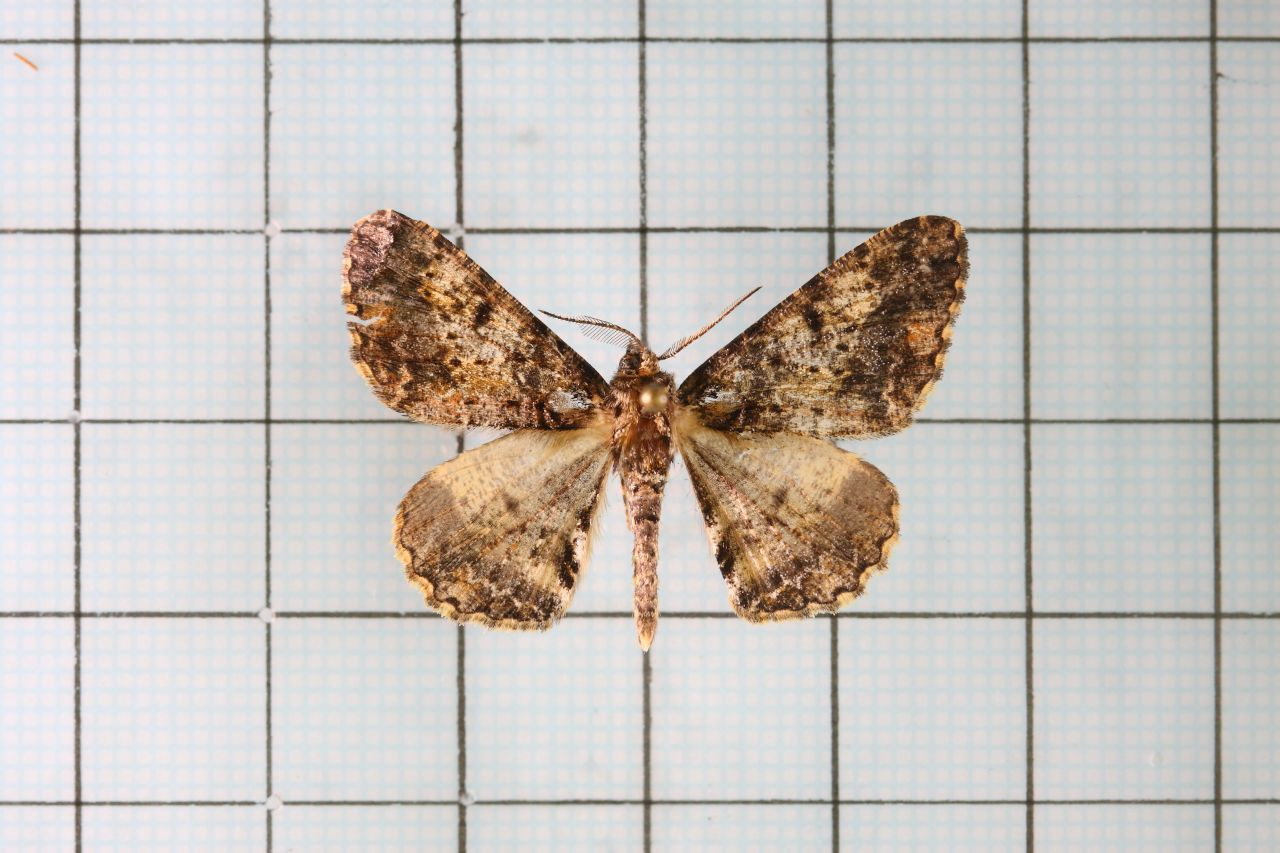

Scientific classification
- Domain: Eukaryota
- Kingdom: Animalia
- Phylum: Arthropoda
- Class: Insecta
- Order: Lepidoptera
- Family: Geometridae
- Subfamily: Ennominae
- Tribe: Boarmiini
- Genus: Alcis
- Species: A. variegata

Binomial name
- Alcis variegata (Moore, 1888)

Synonyms
- Pseudocoremia variegata Moore, 1888; Cleora nebulosa Swinhoe, 1891; Cleora hypopoecila Prout, 1928; Alcis hypopoecila

= Alcis variegata =

Species of moth

Alcis variegata is a moth of the family Geometridae. It is found in India, Sikkim, Nepal, Myanmar, Laos, southern China, northern Vietnam, Thailand, Peninsular Malaysia, and Sumatra.
