= Antona batesii =

Scientific classification
- Domain: Eukaryota
- Kingdom: Animalia
- Phylum: Arthropoda
- Class: Insecta
- Order: Lepidoptera
- Superfamily: Noctuoidea
- Family: Erebidae
- Subfamily: Arctiinae
- Tribe: Lithosiini
- Genus: Antona
- Species: A. batesii

Binomial name
- Antona batesii (Felder, 1874)

Synonyms
- Josiodes batesii Felder, 1874; Josiodes entella Druce, 1899; Josiodes quadrifascia Rothschild, 1912; Josiodes persuperba Bryk, 1953; Josiodes abdominalis Bryk, 1953; Antona batesi

Species of moth

Antona batesii is a moth of the subfamily Arctiinae first described by Felder in 1874. It is found in Guyana and the Amazon basin.

== Subspecies ==
- Antona batesii batesii
- Antona batesii abdominalis (Bryk, 1953)
