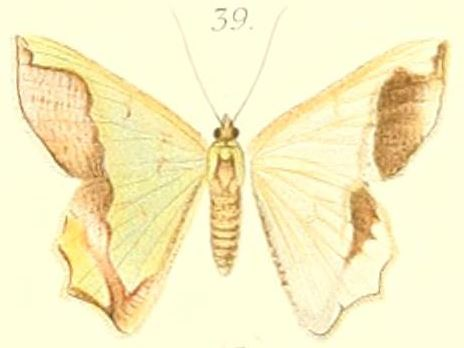

Scientific classification
- Domain: Eukaryota
- Kingdom: Animalia
- Phylum: Arthropoda
- Class: Insecta
- Order: Lepidoptera
- Family: Geometridae
- Genus: Agathiopsis
- Species: A. maculata

Binomial name
- Agathiopsis maculata Warren, 1896

Synonyms
- Agathiopsis angustifascia Warren, 1912; Prasinocyma anomoea Turner, 1910; Agathia benedicta Pagenstecher, 1900; Agathiopsis occidentis Prout, 1933; Agathiopsis unanimis Warren, 1912

= Agathiopsis maculata =

Species of moth

Agathiopsis maculata is a moth of the family Geometridae. It is found on New Guinea and Australia (Queensland).
