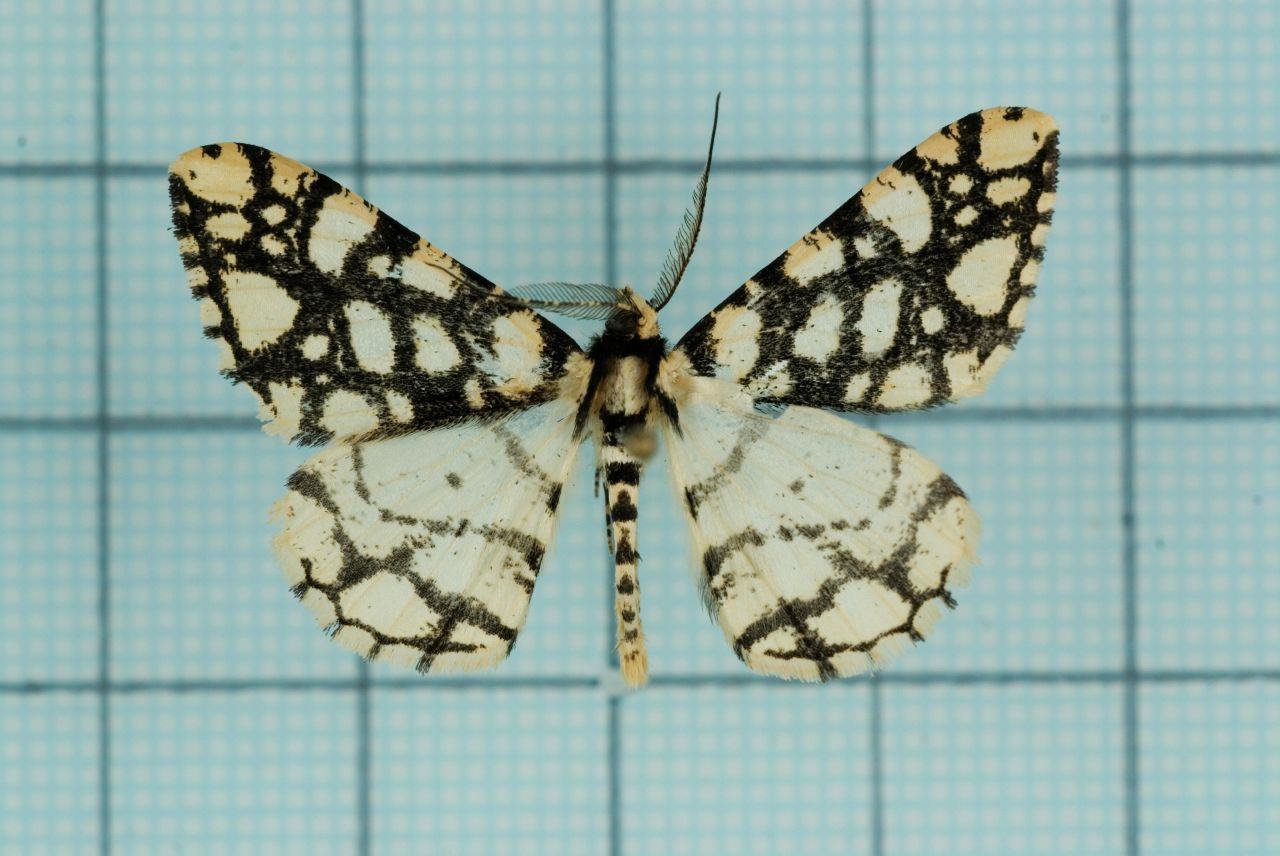
- Alcis maculata taiwanica
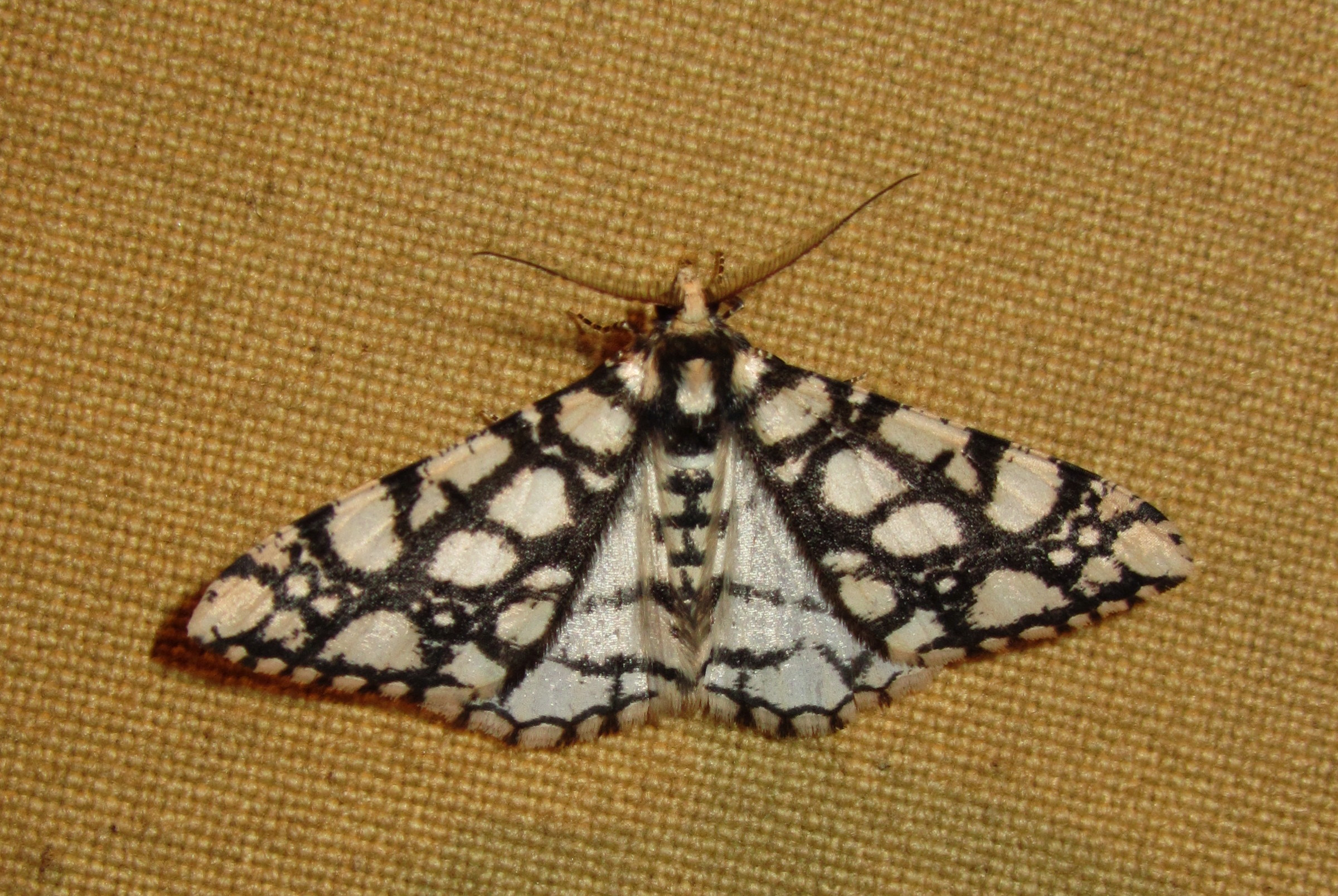

Scientific classification
- Kingdom: Animalia
- Phylum: Arthropoda
- Clade: Pancrustacea
- Class: Insecta
- Order: Lepidoptera
- Family: Geometridae
- Genus: Alcis
- Species: A. maculata

Binomial name
- Alcis maculata (Moore, 1867)

Synonyms
- Arichanna maculata Moore, [1868]; Arichanna plagiogramma Hampson, 1902; Icterodes taiwanica Bastelberger, 1909; Arichanna maculata negans Prout, 1932; Arichanna prodictyota Wehrli, 1934

= Alcis maculata =

Species of moth

Alcis maculata is a moth of the family Geometridae. It is found from Tibet and the Himalaya to Taiwan, Thailand, Sumatra and Borneo.

== Subspecies ==
- Alcis maculata maculata (India, Thailand, Nepal, Tibet)
- Alcis maculata negans (Prout, 1932) (Borneo)
- Alcis maculata prodictyota (Wehrli, 1934) (China)
- Alcis maculata taiwanica (Bastelberger, 1909) (Taiwan)
