= Slender sea pen =

Conservation status
- Least Concern (IUCN 3.1) (Mediterranean)

Scientific classification
- Kingdom: Animalia
- Phylum: Cnidaria
- Subphylum: Anthozoa
- Class: Octocorallia
- Order: Scleralcyonacea
- Family: Virgulariidae
- Genus: Virgularia
- Species: V. mirabilis

Binomial name
- Virgularia mirabilis Muller 1776

Species of marine invertebrate

The slender sea pen (Virgularia mirabilis) is a species of sea pen in the family Virgulariidae, occurring throughout the Mediterranean and Western Europe, with some colonies being found on islands in the Mid-Atlantic.

== Description ==
The slender sea pen stands upright in fine sediments. Their peduncles are buried underneath the sediment, while their raches extend into the water column. Due to their location in fine sediments, they can withdraw into the sediment very quickly. They are able to reach up to 60 cm in length.

It forms elongated and slender colonies, with polyps living on attached side branches. The polyps that form on the slender sea pen are able to form groups as large as 16 on each branch, with the central stem being only a few millimeters thick. The slender sea pen's color ranges from white, to beige, to a light yellow. Research shows that the nerve net in the slender sea pen seems to be well-developed.

== Habitat and distribution ==
The slender sea pen is able to live in both shallow, sheltered locations, as well as up to depths of 400 m. The species is located primarily in the waters of Western Europe, but has also been found in the waters of the Mediterranean and the Mid-Atlantic.

In the Mediterranean, research has shown that the slender sea pen is mainly limited to the continental northern shelves. They are known to have been found farther west, having been located as far as the Azores in the Mid-Atlantic.

In Western Europe, the slender sea pen is commonly found along all the coasts of the British Isles. It is one of the most abundant and widespread of all the British sea pen species, as it has a tolerance to a wide variety of sediments, salinities, and temperatures. In surveys completed off the coast of the western coast of Scotland, the slender sea pen has shown to prefer salinity from 27 to 35, muddy sediments with low percentage of gravel, and depths from 5 to 200 m. They are highly susceptible to damage from seabed disturbance and are often absent from areas where mobile fishing gear is trawled or dredged across the surface of the seabed.

== Ecology ==
Slender sea pens typically feed on zooplankton and other organic particles, however they also have been known to feed upon small animals that have been swept into their branches. They possess nematocysts, so the species is capable of both passive predation of small animals and suspension feeding of particles. The species is primarily a passive carnivore, but will also suspension feed when particles become trapped in the mucus on the ends of their branches.

Slender sea pens are not associated with many other fauna. Due to their ability to retract into the sediment, they are not very suitable for epizoic organisms to sit on

== Reproduction ==
The sexes are separate, with each colony of polyps being either male or female. Each colony will remain the same sex for their entire life span. The frequency of their reproduction is annually episodic, with reproduction happening between June and October. The larvae have the ability to disperse over a length of 10 km. Little other information is known about the reproductive cycles of slender sea pen, though research inter similar species suggests that up to 200,000 eggs could be produced per female colony.
