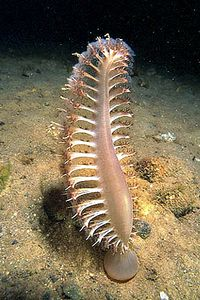
- Pennatula phosphorea

Scientific classification
- Kingdom: Animalia
- Phylum: Cnidaria
- Subphylum: Anthozoa
- Class: Octocorallia
- Order: Scleralcyonacea
- Family: Pennatulidae
- Genus: Pennatula

Species
- Pennatula aculeata Danielssen, 1860; Pennatula bayeri Barreira e Castro & Semaro de Medeiros, 2001; Pennatula delicata Tixier-Durivault, 1966; Pennatula fimbriata Herklots, 1858; Pennatula grandis Ehrenberg, 1834; Pennatula indica Thomson & Henderson, 1906; Pennatula inflata Kükenthal, 1910; Pennatula mollis Alder, 1867; Pennatula moseleyi Kölliker, 1880; Pennatula murrayi Kölliker, 1880; Pennatula naresi Kölliker, 1880; Pennatula pearceyi Kölliker, 1880; Pennatula phosphorea Linnaeus, 1758; Pennatula prolifera Jungersen, 1904; Pennatula rubra (Ellis, 1761)

Synonyms
- Ptilella Gray, 1870

= Pennatula =

Genus of corals

Pennatula is a genus of sea pens in the family Pennatulidae. The genus contains several bioluminescent species, including Pennatula rubra, Pennatula phosphorea, and Pennatula aculeata.
