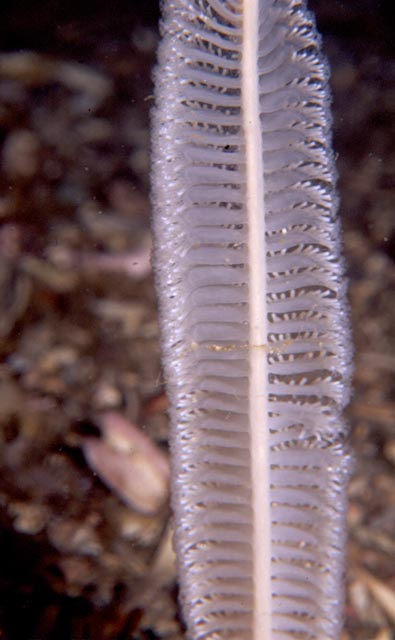
- Feathery sea pen

Scientific classification
- Kingdom: Animalia
- Phylum: Cnidaria
- Subphylum: Anthozoa
- Class: Octocorallia
- Order: Scleralcyonacea
- Family: Virgulariidae
- Genus: Virgularia
- Species: V. schultzei

Binomial name
- Virgularia schultzei Kukenthal, 1910

= Feathery sea pen =

Species of coral

The feathery sea pen (Virgularia schultzei) is a species of sea pen in the family Virgulariidae.

== Description ==
Feathery sea pens stand upright in the sand like the quill of a feather. The central axis has flat branch-like extensions on which the polyps are clustered. They are usually white or cream. The peduncle is very long and the entire colony can retract into the sand if disturbed. This species may grow to 50 cm in height and is about 1 cm wide.

== Distribution and habitat ==
The Feathery Sea Pen is known from Luderitz in Namibia and round the southern African coast to central Mozambique in 6-222m under water. It lives in sand and feeds on micro-plankton.
