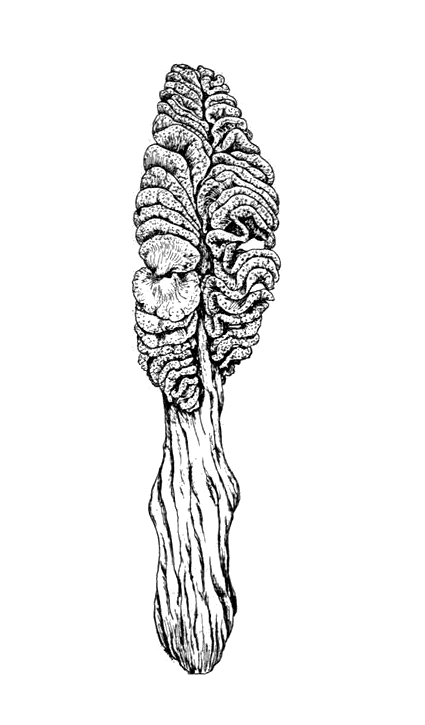
- A drawing of Sarcoptilus grandis

Scientific classification
- Domain: Eukaryota
- Kingdom: Animalia
- Phylum: Cnidaria
- Subphylum: Anthozoa
- Class: Octocorallia
- Order: Pennatulacea
- Family: Pennatulidae
- Genus: Sarcoptilus; Gray, 1848

Type species
- Sarcoptilus grandis

= Sarcoptilus =

Genus of cnidarians

Sarcoptilus is a genus of sea pen.

== Description ==
They are colonial, medium-sized sea pens with relatively tiny polyps.

== Species ==
- Sarcoptilus bollonsi (Benham, 1906)
- Sarcoptilus grandis Gray, 1848
- Sarcoptilus nullispiculatus Williams, 1995
- Sarcoptilus rigidis Williams, 1995
- Sarcoptilus shaneparkeri Williams, 1995
- Sarcoptilus roseum? (Broch, 1910)
