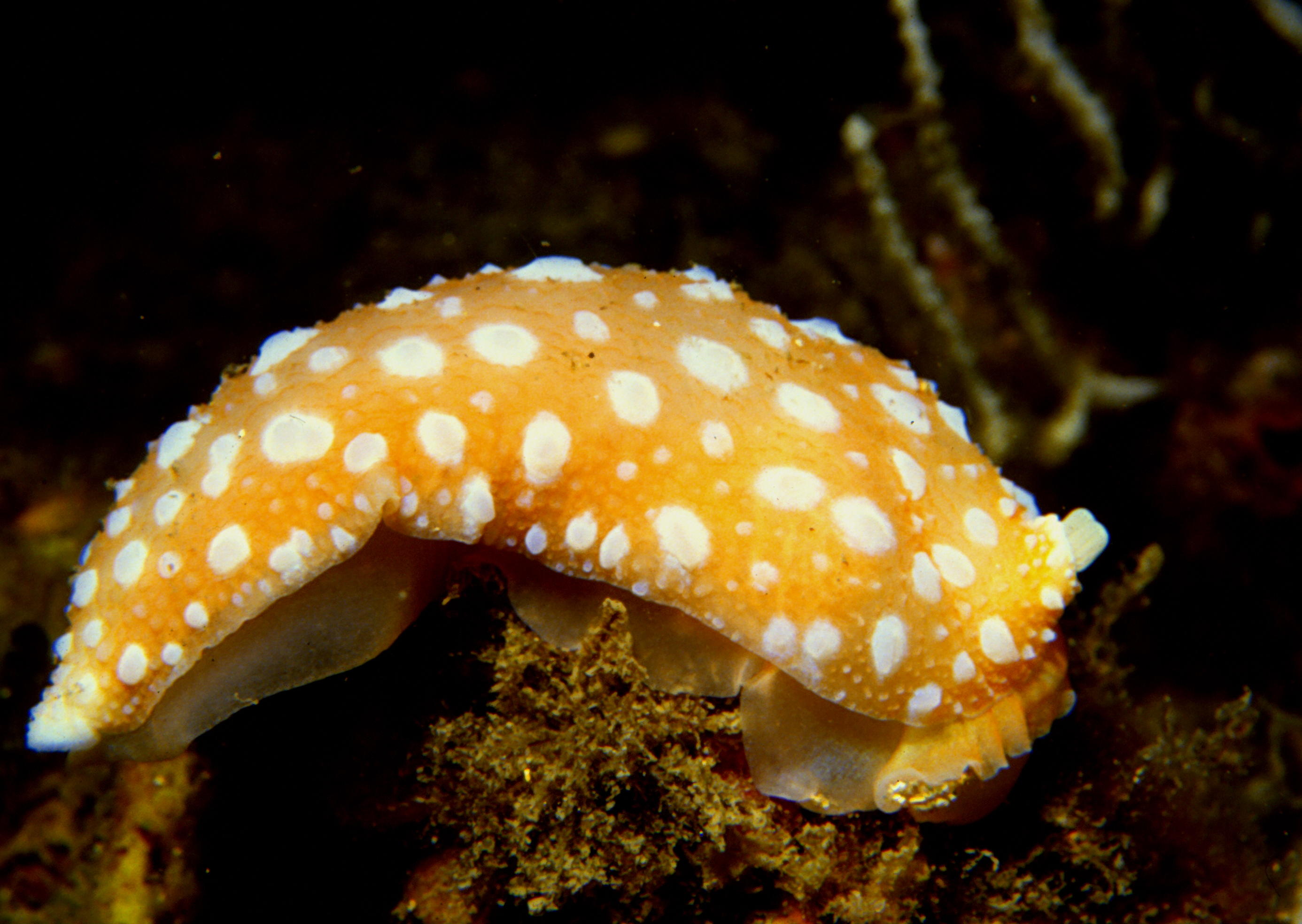
- A live individual of the species, in situ, head towards the right

Scientific classification
- Kingdom: Animalia
- Phylum: Mollusca
- Class: Gastropoda
- Order: Nudibranchia
- Suborder: Cladobranchia
- Family: Arminidae
- Genus: Armina
- Species: A. maculata

Binomial name
- Armina maculata (Rafinesque, 1814)

Synonyms
- Diphyllidia ocellata Deshayes, 1838; Diphyllidia pustulosa Philippi, 1836; Diphyllidia verrucosa Cantraine, 1835

= Armina maculata =

Species of gastropod

Armina maculata is a species of sea slug, a nudibranch, a marine gastropod mollusk in the family Arminidae.

== Description ==
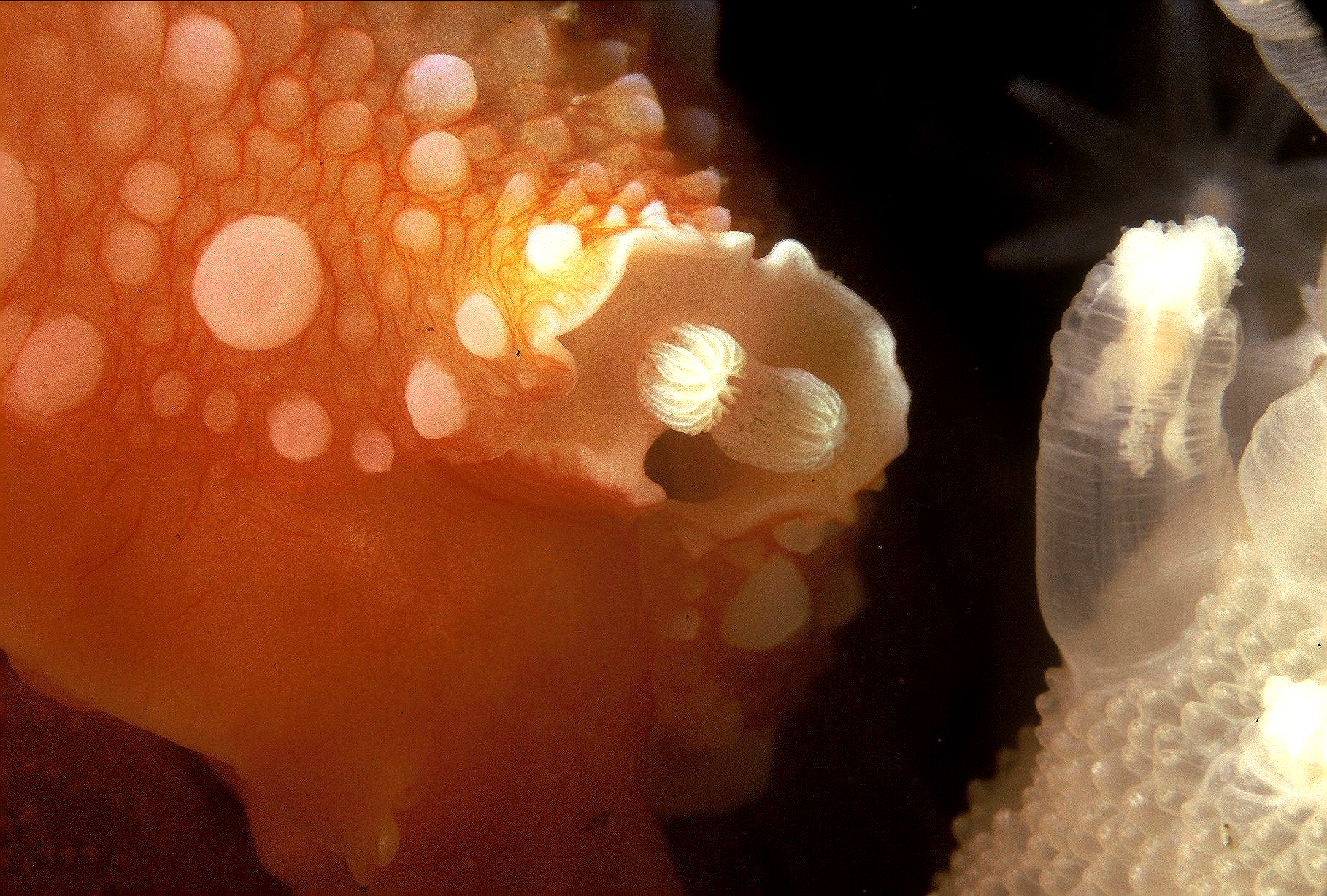
Close up of head area

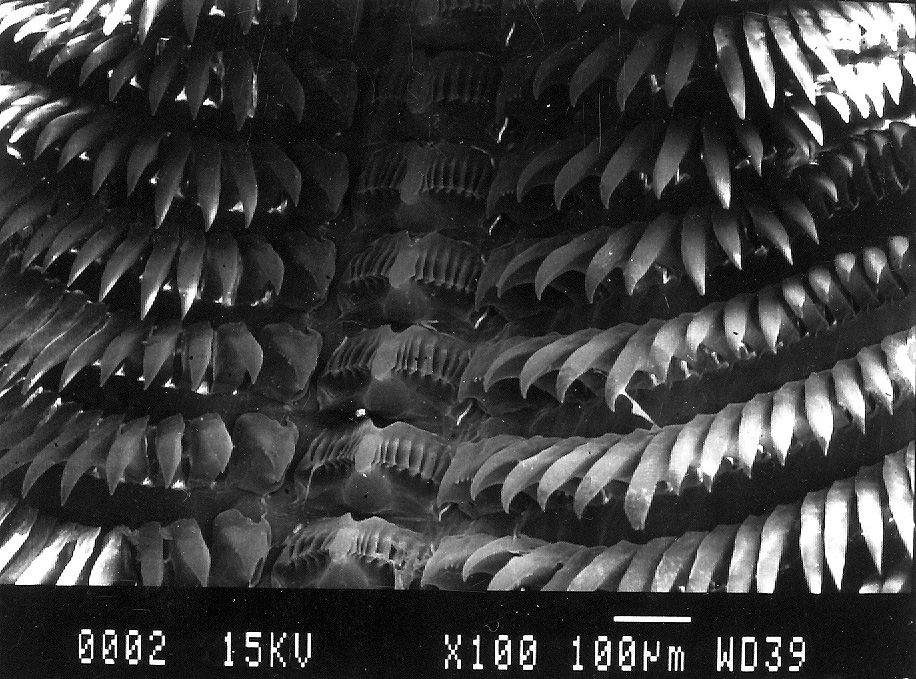
Electron micrograph of the radula of the species

The mantle is colored bright orange, and is uniformly covered with white bumps. Individuals can be found up to 15 cm.

== Distribution ==
This species occurs in European waters and the Mediterranean Sea. It has often been observed feeding on the sea pen Veretillum cynomorium.
