= Gyrophyllum =

Scientific classification
- Domain: Eukaryota
- Kingdom: Animalia
- Phylum: Cnidaria
- Subphylum: Anthozoa
- Class: Octocorallia
- Order: Pennatulacea
- Family: Pennatulidae
- Genus: Gyrophyllum; Studer, 1891

Genus of corals

Gyrophyllum is a genus of corals belonging to the family Pennatulidae.

The species of this genus are found in Central Atlantic Ocean, Malesia, Australia.

Species:

- Gyrophyllum hirondellei Studer, 1891
- Gyrophyllum sibogae Hickson, 1916
