= Stachyptilum =

Scientific classification
- Domain: Eukaryota
- Kingdom: Animalia
- Phylum: Cnidaria
- Subphylum: Anthozoa
- Class: Octocorallia
- Order: Pennatulacea
- Family: Stachyptilidae
- Genus: Stachyptilum; Kölliker, 1880

Type species
- Stachyptilum macleari Kölliker, 1880

Species
- Stachyptilum dofleini Balss, 1909; Stachyptilum macleari Kölliker, 1880; Stachyptilum superbum Studer, 1894

Genus of corals

Stachyptilum is a genus in the family Stachyptilidae. The genus contains bioluminescent species.
