= Kophobelemnidae =

Scientific classification
- Kingdom: Animalia
- Phylum: Cnidaria
- Subphylum: Anthozoa
- Class: Octocorallia
- Order: Scleralcyonacea
- Superfamily: Pennatuloidea
- Family: Kophobelemnidae

Family of cnidarians

Kophobelemnidae is a family of corals belonging to the order Pennatulacea.

Genera:

- Kophobelemnon Asbjørnsen, 1856
- Malacobelemnon Tixier-Durivault, 1965
- Sclerobelemnon Kölliker, 1872
