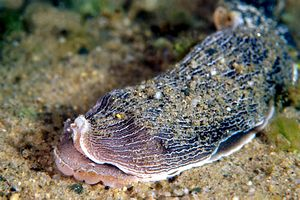

Scientific classification
- Domain: Eukaryota
- Kingdom: Animalia
- Phylum: Mollusca
- Class: Gastropoda
- Order: Nudibranchia
- Suborder: Cladobranchia
- Family: Arminidae
- Genus: Armina
- Species: A. tigrina

Binomial name
- Armina tigrina Rafinesque, 1814

Synonyms
- Diphyllidia lineata Otto, 1820; Pleurophyllidia cuvieri Meckel, 1823; Pleurophyllidia undulata Meckel, 1816

= Armina tigrina =

Species of gastropod

Armina tigrina is a species of sea slug, a nudibranch, a marine gastropod mollusk in the family Arminidae.
