= Protoptilidae =

Scientific classification
- Kingdom: Animalia
- Phylum: Cnidaria
- Subphylum: Anthozoa
- Class: Octocorallia
- Order: Scleralcyonacea
- Superfamily: Pennatuloidea
- Family: Protoptilidae

Family of corals

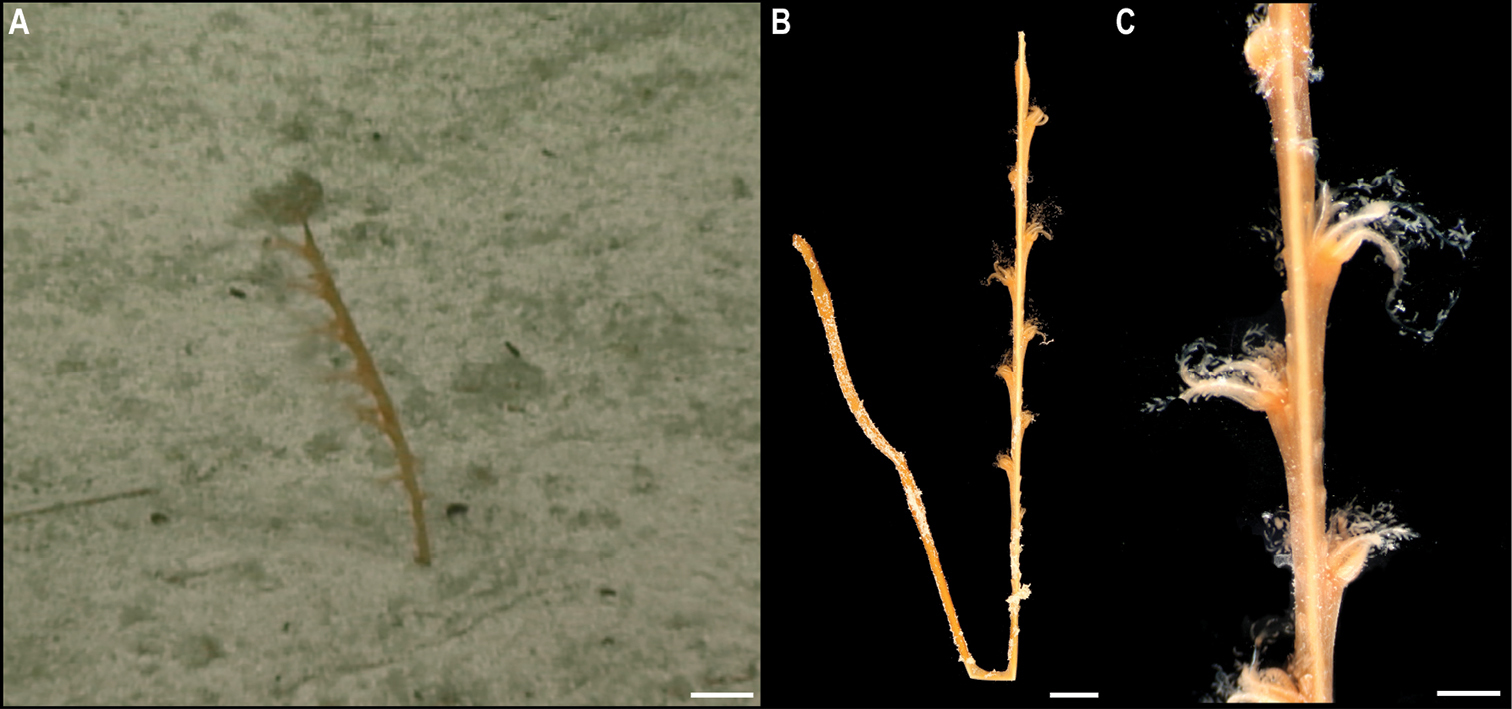
Protoptilum stet. (A). in situ image (B). whole colony (C). detail of polyps before preservation.

Protoptilidae is a family of corals belonging to the order Pennatulacea.

Genera:

- Distichoptilum Verrill, 1882
- Protoptilum Kölliker, 1872
