= Scleroptilidae =

Scientific classification
- Kingdom: Animalia
- Phylum: Cnidaria
- Subphylum: Anthozoa
- Class: Octocorallia
- Order: Scleralcyonacea
- Superfamily: Pennatuloidea
- Family: Scleroptilidae

Family of corals

Scleroptilidae is a family of corals belonging to the order Pennatulacea.

Genera:

- Calibelemnon Nutting, 1908
- Scleroptilum Kölliker, 1880
