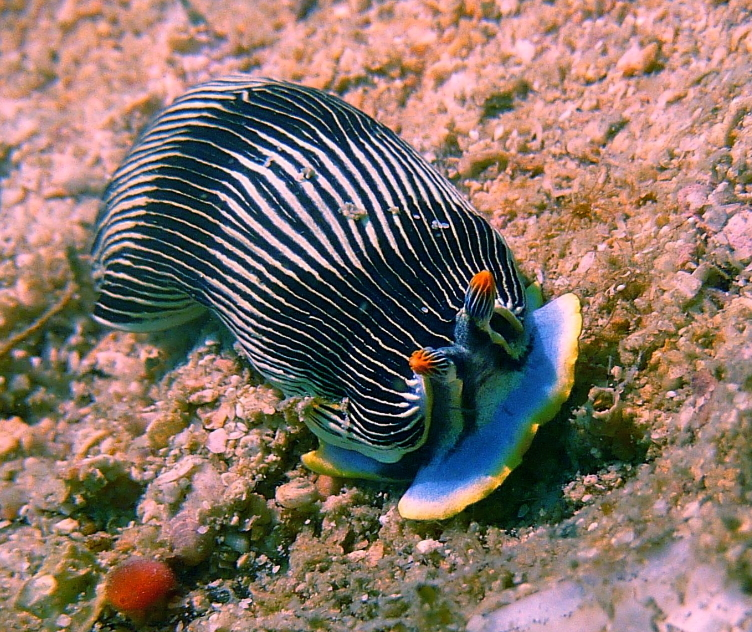
- Live specimen of Armina scotti

Scientific classification
- Kingdom: Animalia
- Phylum: Mollusca
- Class: Gastropoda
- Order: Nudibranchia
- Suborder: Cladobranchia
- Family: Arminidae
- Genus: Armina
- Species: A. scotti

Binomial name
- Armina scotti Mehrotra, Caballer & Chavanich, 2017

= Armina scotti =

Species of sea slug

Armina scotti is a species of sea slug, a nudibranch, a marine gastropod mollusk in the family Arminidae.

== Description ==
Armina scotti have a black dorsum with yellow ridges, and typically have three yellow blotch-like spots on their exterior. They have a blue and yellow submarginal band, and a yellow and black striped appearance. They are approximately 35 mm (1.4 in) in length. They contain up to four rows of teeth.

== Distribution ==
Armina scotti have been found in Thailand, Philippines, Madagascar, Papua New Guinea, and Indonesia.

== Discovery ==
Armina scotti was discovered in 2017 in Koh Tao, Thailand. It was discovered by Rahul Mehrotra during a project to record the diverse sea slug populations in the area. Mehrotra and his research team at the New Heaven Reef Conservation Program have continued to research sea slugs in Koh Tao.

== Conservation ==
Coral Reefs of Koh Tao, Thailand are home to a wide biodiversity of sea slugs. Reefs in Koh Tao are threatened by coral bleaching, reef tourism, and anthropogenic pollutants.
