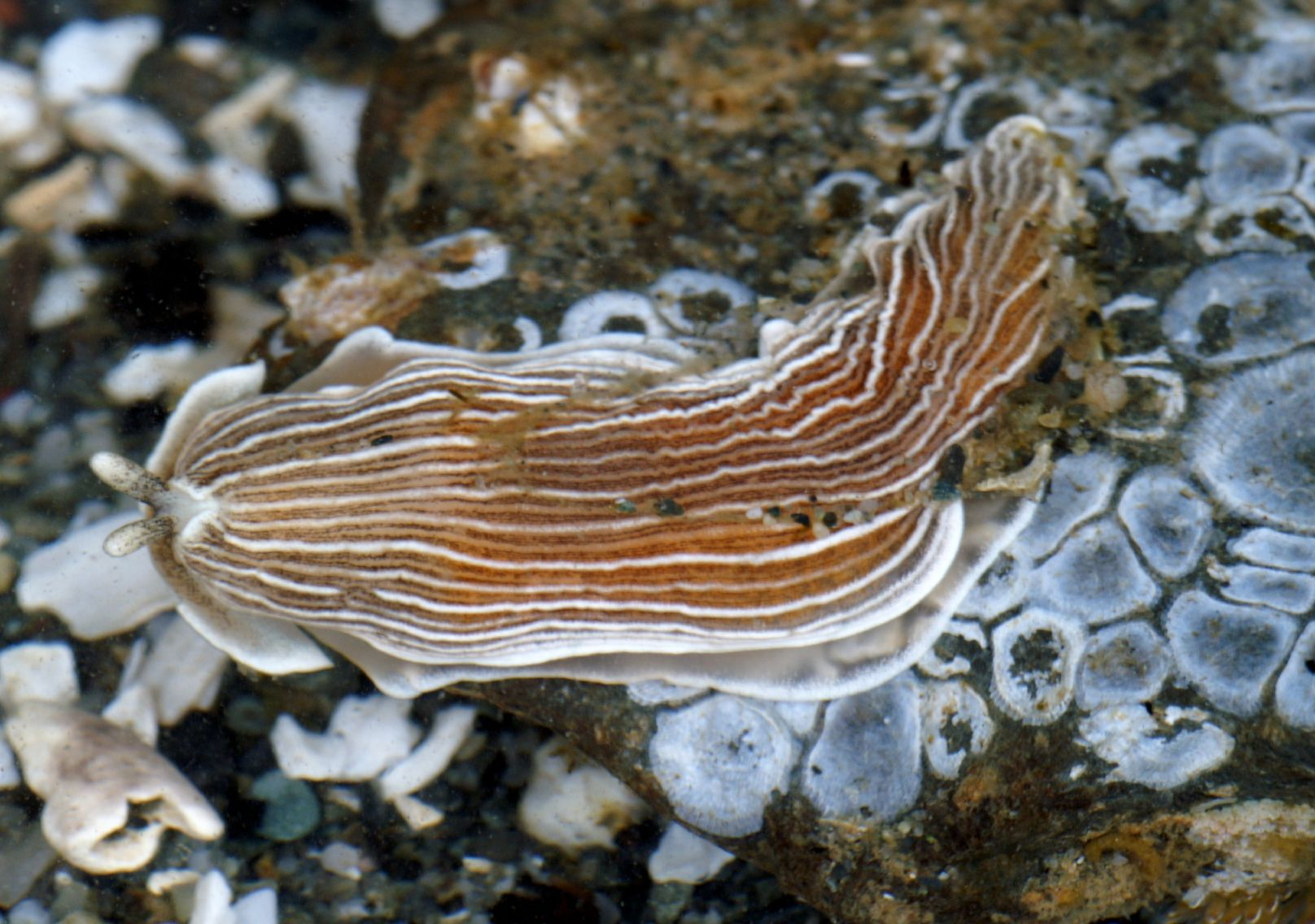

Scientific classification
- Kingdom: Animalia
- Phylum: Mollusca
- Class: Gastropoda
- Order: Nudibranchia
- Suborder: Cladobranchia
- Family: Arminidae
- Genus: Armina
- Species: A. californica

Binomial name
- Armina californica (J. G. Cooper, 1863)

Synonyms
- Armina columbiana O'Donoghue, 1924; Armina digueti Pruvot-Fol, 1956; Armina vancouverensis (Bergh, 1876); Pleurophyllidia californica Cooper, 1863 (basionym)

= Armina californica =

Species of gastropod

Armina californica is a species of sea slug, a nudibranch, a marine gastropod mollusk in the family Arminidae.

This species occurs in the Eastern Pacific Ocean from Vancouver Island to Panama. It can commonly be found in a soft-bottom habitat from 1-230 meters in depth. Armina californica is characterized by longitudinal ridges of varying colors including light pink, cream, and brown. Features that differentiate Armina californica from the larger Armina species are separated rhinophores, rachidian teeth with 8-13 elongated denticles, and lateral teeth with 7-9 triangular denticles.
