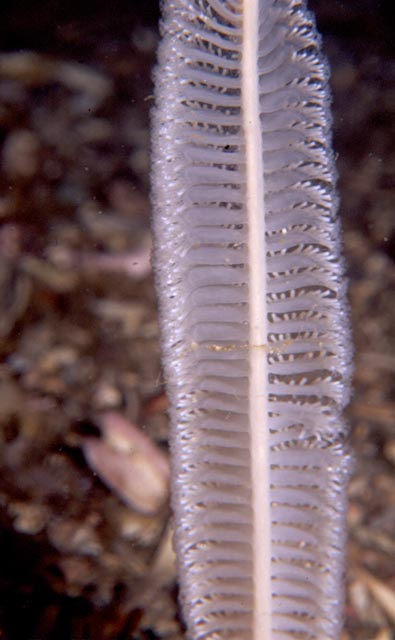
- feathery sea pen

Scientific classification
- Kingdom: Animalia
- Phylum: Cnidaria
- Subphylum: Anthozoa
- Class: Octocorallia
- Order: Scleralcyonacea
- Family: Virgulariidae
- Genus: Virgularia; Lamarck 1816

= Virgularia =

Genus of corals

Virgularia is a genus of sea pen in the family Virgulariidae.

== Species ==
- Virgularia abies Kölliker, 1870
- Virgularia agassizi Studer, 1894
- Virgularia alba (Nutting, 1912)
- Virgularia brochi Kükenthal, 1915
- Virgularia bromleyi Kölliker, 1880
- Virgularia densa Tixier-Durivault, 1966
- Virgularia galapagensis Hickson, 1930
- Virgularia glacialis Kölliker, 1870
- Virgularia gracilis
- Virgularia gracillima Kõlliker, 1880
- Virgularia gustaviana (Herklots, 1863)
- Virgularia halisceptrum Broch, 1910
- Virgularia juncea (Pallas, 1766)
- Virgularia kophameli May, 1899
- Virgularia loveni Utinomi, 1971
- Virgularia mirabilis (Müller, 1776)
- Virgularia presbytes Bayer, 1955
- Virgularia reinwardti Herklots, 1858
- Virgularia rumphi Kölliker, 1870
- Virgularia schultzei Kukenthal, 1910
- Virgularia tuberculata Marshall, 1883
