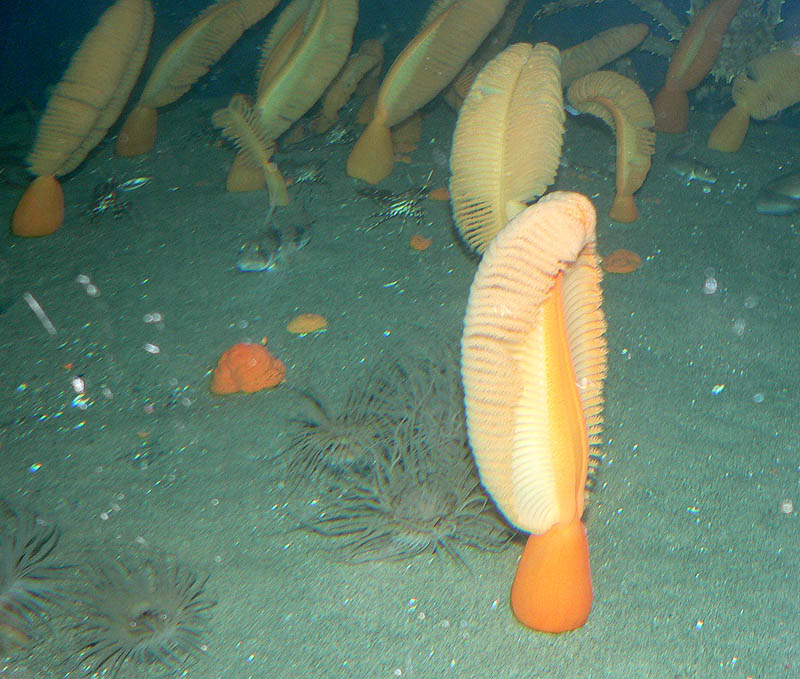
- Orange sea pens, with retracted individual at center left

Scientific classification
- Kingdom: Animalia
- Phylum: Cnidaria
- Subphylum: Anthozoa
- Class: Octocorallia
- Order: Scleralcyonacea
- Family: Pennatulidae
- Genus: Ptilosarcus
- Species: P. gurneyi

Binomial name
- Ptilosarcus gurneyi (Gray, 1860)

= Ptilosarcus gurneyi =

Orange sea pen

Species of coral

(video) Orange sea pens

Ptilosarcus gurneyi, the orange sea pen or fleshy sea pen, is a species of sea pen in the family Pennatulidae. It is native to the northeastern Pacific Ocean where it lives in deep water anchored by its base in sand or mud. It has received its common name because of its resemblance to a quill in a bottle of ink.

== Description ==
The orange sea pen is a colonial cnidarian, the individual polyps having their own specialised functions. One, the primary polyp, loses its tentacles and forms both the stalk of the colony (known as the rachis), and the bulbous base with which it anchors itself deep into the soft substrate. Other polyps are known as secondary polyps. They include autozooids, which are feeding polyps, being armed with cnidocytes on the eight branching tentacles which form the feathery branches of the sea pen. They also contain the gonads. Other secondary polyps are siphonozooids, which can force water into and out of the colony to ventilate it. When the colony is disturbed, it can pump water out and retract into its bulbous base. At this time it emits bioluminescence, perhaps in order to startle a potential predator. The animal resembles an old-fashioned quill pen. It grows to a height of about 46 centimetres (18 in) and can be white, yellow or orange.

== Distribution and habitat ==
The orange sea pen is found on the western coast of North America, its range extending from Alaska to southern California. It grows on soft sand or mud substrates at depths ranging from 14 to 225 metres (46 to 738 ft).

== Biology ==
The orange sea pen feeds on plankton which it catches with the tentacles on its feathery plumes. It orients itself at right angles to the current and can relocate to a new location if it wishes. Breeding takes place when eggs and sperm are produced by the autozooids and expelled through the mouth into the water column. The planula larvae drift as part of the plankton before settling on the seabed and undergoing metamorphosis. The newly formed juveniles are the founding primary polyps of new colonies.

Certain starfish prey on the orange sea pen. It can distinguish between the threats posed by the specialist predator leather star (Dermasterias imbricata), the generalist predator sunflower seastar (Pycnopodia helianthoides) and the ochre sea star (Pisaster ochraceus), which does not feed on sea pens. It reacts by emitting a flash of light and diving into the sand when contact is made by the leather star, sometimes behaves similarly when approached by the sunflower seastar and does not react defensively when touched by the ochre sea star.
