= Stachyptilidae =

Scientific classification
- Kingdom: Animalia
- Phylum: Cnidaria
- Subphylum: Anthozoa
- Class: Octocorallia
- Order: Scleralcyonacea
- Superfamily: Pennatuloidea
- Family: Stachyptilidae

Family of corals

Stachyptilidae is a family of corals belonging to the order Pennatulacea.

Genera:

- Gilibelemnon Lopez Gonzalez & Williams, 2002
- Stachyptilum Kölliker, 1880
