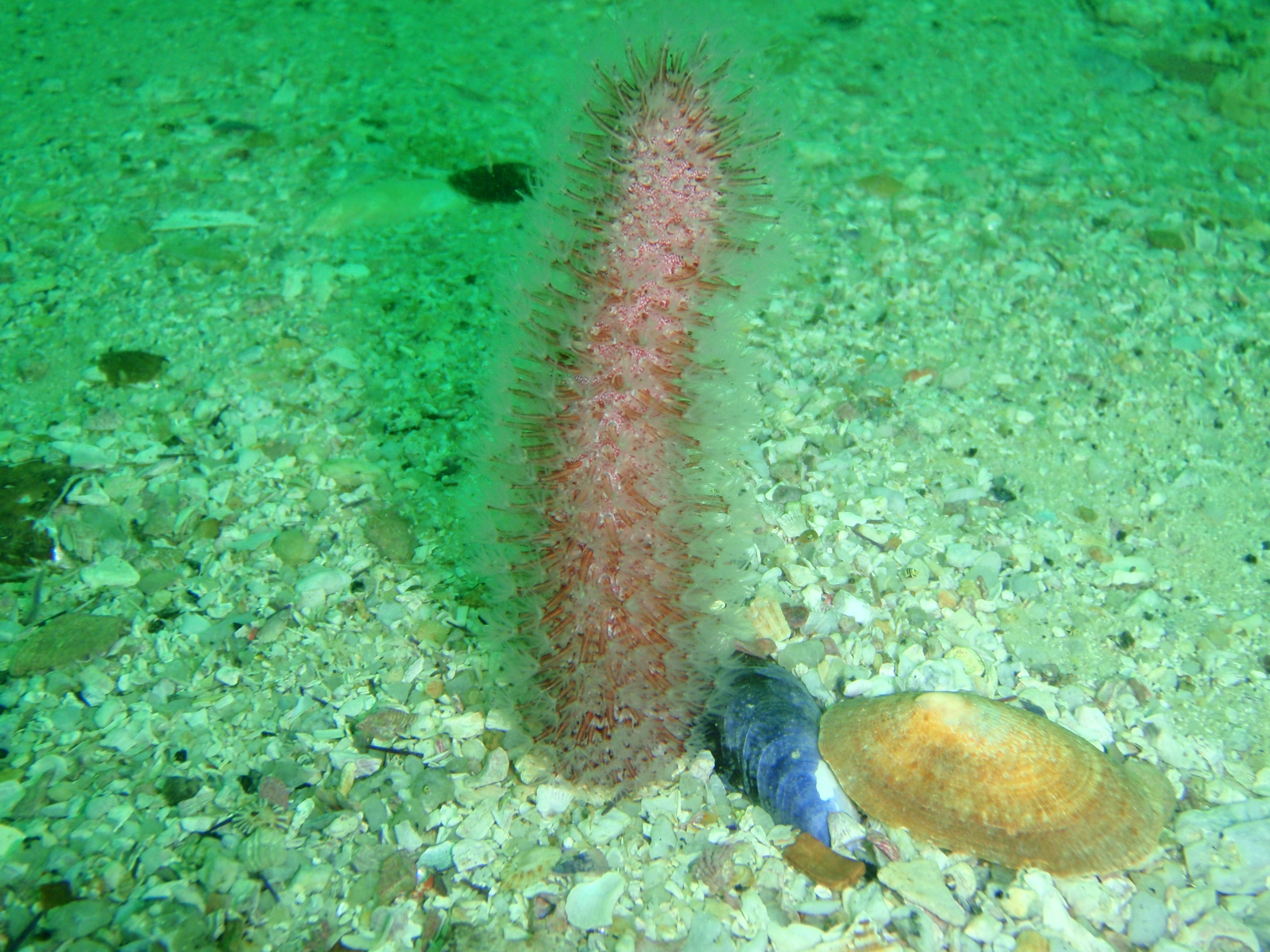
- Actinoptilum molle

Scientific classification
- Kingdom: Animalia
- Phylum: Cnidaria
- Subphylum: Anthozoa
- Class: Octocorallia
- Order: Scleralcyonacea
- Superfamily: Pennatuloidea
- Family: Echinoptilidae; Hubrecht, 1885

= Echinoptilidae =

Family of corals

Echinoptilidae is a family of sea pens, a member of the subclass Octocorallia in the phylum Cnidaria.

== Characteristics ==
Colonies are cylindrical without axis, and the rachis is generally longer than the peduncle. The colony may be radially or bilaterally symmetrical. Autozooids have non-retractile, bifurcated calyces with many sclerites.

== Distribution ==
Indo-West Pacific to south western Africa in shallow sublittoral to over 800m depth.

== Genera ==
The World Register of Marine Species list the following genera:

- Genus Actinoptilum Kükenthal, 1911
- Genus Echinoptilum Hubrecht, 1885
