= Anthoptilidae =

Scientific classification
- Kingdom: Animalia
- Phylum: Cnidaria
- Subphylum: Anthozoa
- Class: Octocorallia
- Order: Scleralcyonacea
- Superfamily: Pennatuloidea
- Family: Anthoptilidae

Family of corals

Anthoptilidae is a family of sea pens belonging to the suborder Sessiliflorae.

Genera:

- Anthoptilum Kölliker, 1880
- Benthoptillum Verrill, 1885
