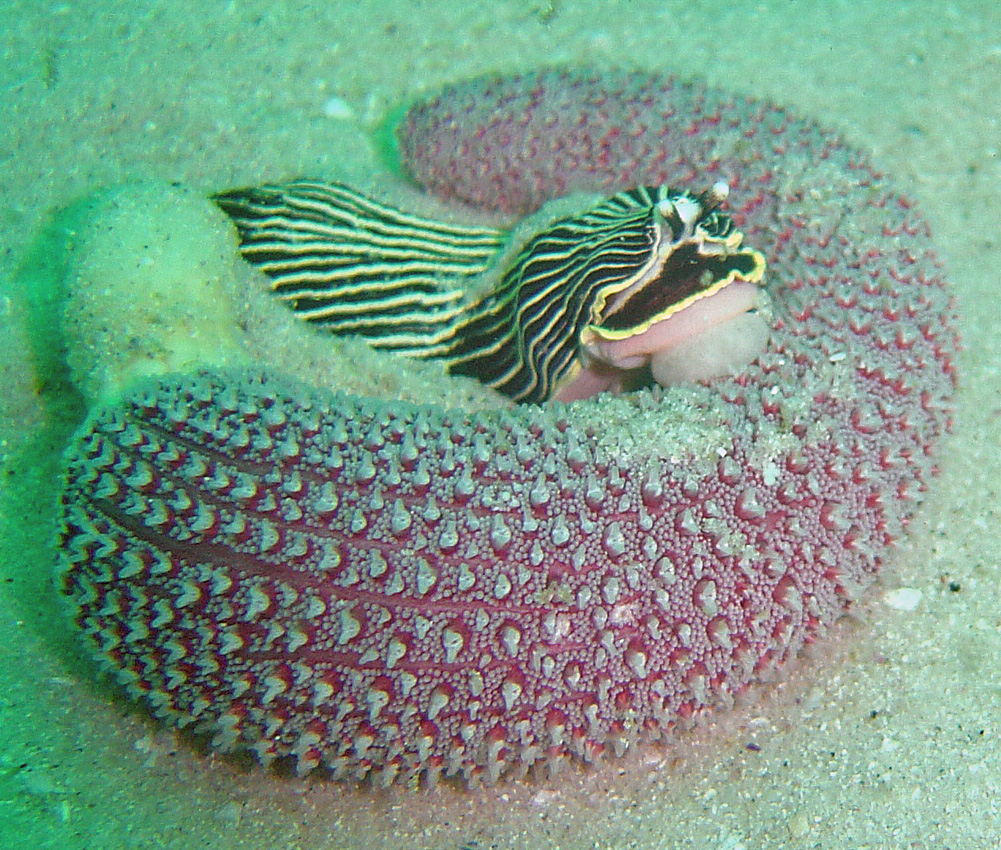
- Pierre's armina feeding on the purple sea pen Actinoptilum molle

Scientific classification
- Kingdom: Animalia
- Phylum: Mollusca
- Class: Gastropoda
- Order: Nudibranchia
- Suborder: Cladobranchia
- Family: Arminidae
- Genus: Armina
- Species: A. sp.

Binomial name
- Armina sp.

= Pierre's armina =

Species of gastropod

Pierre's armina, scientific name Armina sp. (as designated by Zsilavecz, 2007), is a species of sea slug, a nudibranch. It is a marine gastropod mollusc in the family Arminidae. This species was undescribed by science as of November 2009.

== Distribution ==
In 2009, this species had only been found off South Africa, in False Bay off Windmill Beach, in at least 10 m of water. It appears to be endemic.

== Description ==
Pierre's armina grows up to 70 mm (2.8 in) in length. It is a black-bodied nudibranch with raised white longitudinal ridges. The edge of the mantle is yellow and the foot is pinkish with a yellow margin. It has small ridged rhinophores, which are close together at their base.

== Ecology ==
Pierre's armina burrows in sand and feeds on the purple sea pen, Actinoptilum molle.
