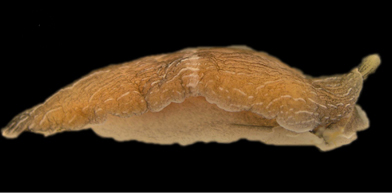
- Armina neapolitana

Scientific classification
- Kingdom: Animalia
- Phylum: Mollusca
- Class: Gastropoda
- Order: Nudibranchia
- Suborder: Cladobranchia
- Family: Arminidae
- Genus: Armina (Rafinesque, 1814)

Type species
- Armina tigrina Rafinesque, 1814

Synonyms
- Diphyllidia Blainville, 1819; Linguella Férussac, 1822; Pleurophyllidia Meckel, 1823; Sancara Bergh, 1860

= Armina =

Genus of gastropods

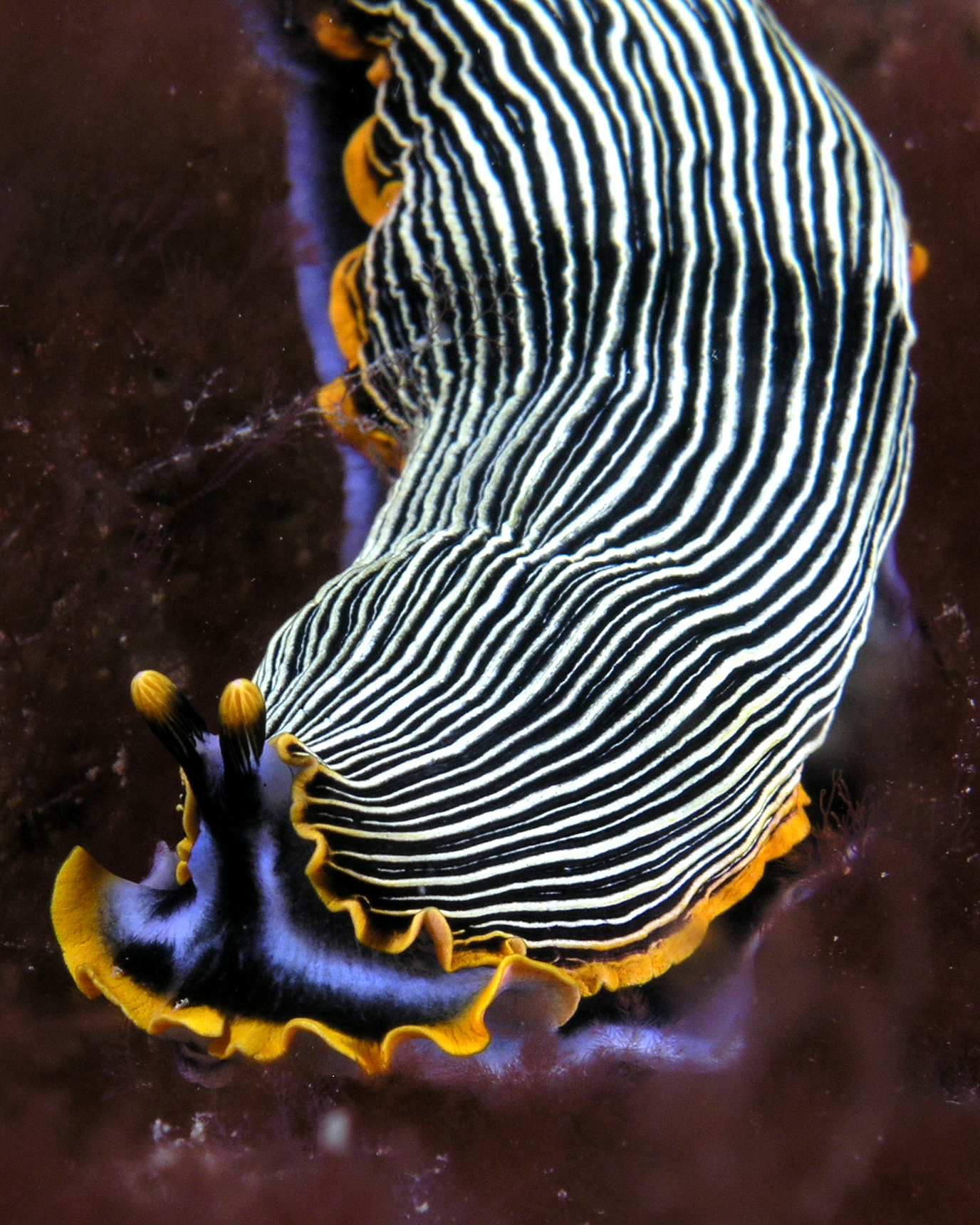
Armina sp. from East Timor.

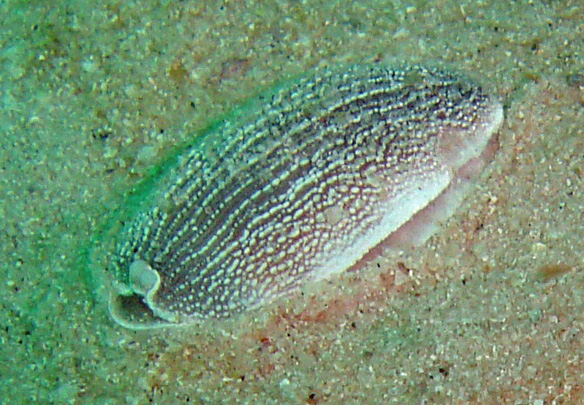
A. gilchristi from South Africa.

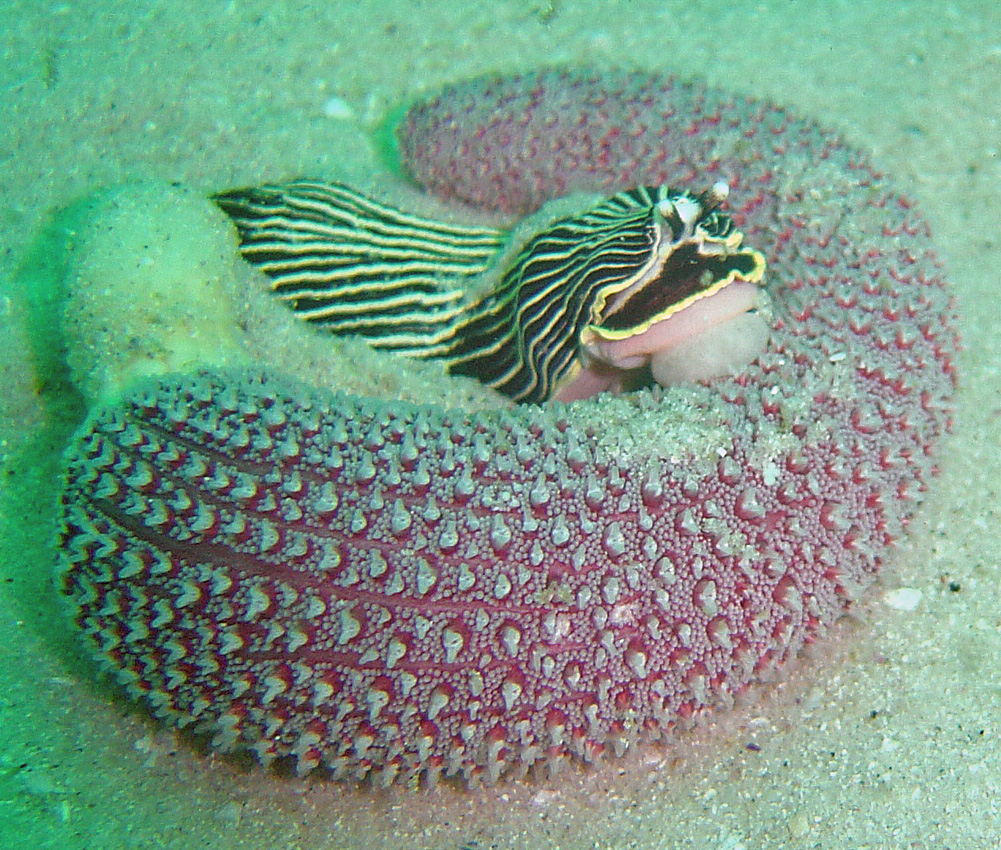
Armina sp. Pierre's armina, from South Africa

Armina is a genus of sea slugs, specifically nudibranchs, marine gastropod mollusks in the family Arminidae.

Armina loveni is known to prey on pennatulacean octocorals, consuming the polyps of these colonial animals.

== Species ==
Species within the genus Armina include:

- Armina adami (White, 1955)
- Armina aoteana (Miller & Willan, 1986)
- Armina appendiculata Baba, 1949
- Armina babai (Tchang, 1934)
- Armina ballesterosi (Ortea, 1989)
- Armina bayeri (Marcus & Marcus, 1966)
- Armina bilamella Lin, 1981
- Armina californica (J.G. Cooper, 1863)
- Armina capensis (Bergh, 1907)
- Armina cara Marcus, 1971
- Armina carneola (Lim & Chou, 1970)
- Armina cinerea (Farran, 1905)
- Armina comta (Bergh, 1880)
- Armina cordellensis (Gosliner & Behrens, 1996)
- Armina cuvierii (Orbigny, 1837)
- Armina cygnea (Bergh, 1876)
- Armina elongata (Ardila & Valdes, 2004)
- Armina euchroa (Bergh, 1907)
- Armina formosa (Kelaart, 1858)
- Armina gilchristi (White, 1955)
- Armina grisea (O'Donoghue, 1929)
- Armina japonica (Eliot, 1913)
- Armina joia (Marcus & Marcus, 1966)
- Armina juliana (Ardila & Diaz, 2002)
- Armina liouvillei (Pruvot-Fol, 1953)
- Armina longicauda Lin, 1981
- Armina loveni (Bergh, 1866)
- Armina maculata (Rafinesque, 1814)
- Armina magna (Baba, 1955)
- Armina major (Baba, 1949)
- Armina microdonta (Bergh, 1907)
- Armina muelleri (Ihering, 1886)
- Armina natalensis (Bergh, 1866)
- Armina neapolitana (delle Chiaje, 1824)
- Armina occulta Mehrotra, Caballer & Chavanich, 2017
- Armina papillata (Baba, 1933)
- Armina paucifoliata Baba, 1955
- Armina punctilopsis Lin, 1992
- Armina punctilucens (Bergh, 1874)
- Armina punctulata (Lin, 1990)
- Armina rubida (A. Gould, 1852)
- Armina scotti Mehrotra, Caballer & Chavanich, 2017
- Armina semperi (Bergh, 1861)
- Armina serrata (O'Donoghue, 1929)
- Armina simoniana (Thiele, 1925)
- Armina sinensis Lin, 1981
- Armina taeniolata (Bergh, 1860)
- Armina tigrina (Rafinesque, 1814) : type species
- Armina tricuspidata (Thompson, Cattaneo, & Wong, 1990)
- Armina undulata (Meckel, 1823)
- Armina variolosa (Bergh, 1904)
- Armina wattla (Marcus & Marcus, 1967)
- Armina xandra (Marcus & Marcus, 1966)
- Armina sp. Pierre's armina

Species brought into synonymy

- Armina abbotti (Thompson, Cattaneo, & Wong, 1990): synonym of Armina wattla Ev. Marcus & Er. Marcus, 1967
- Armina columbiana (O'Donoghue, 1924): synonym of Armina californica (J. G. Cooper, 1863)
- Armina convolvula Lance, 1962: synonym of Histiomena marginata (Oersted in Mørch, 1859)
- Armina digueti (Pruvot-Fol, 1955): synonym of Armina californica (J. G. Cooper, 1863)
- Armina henneguyi (Labbé, 1922): synonym of Pleurophyllidia henneguyi Labbé, 1922 (taxon inquirendum)
- Armina mulleri (Ihering, 1886): synonym of Armina muelleri (Ihering, 1886)
- Armina paucidentata (O'Donoghue, 1932): synonym of Pleurophyllidiella paucidentata O'Donoghue, 1932
- Armina pustulosa (Schultz in Philippi, 1836): synonym of Armina maculata Rafinesque, 1814
- Armina vancouverensis (Bergh, 1876): synonym of Armina californica (J. G. Cooper, 1863)
