= Balticinidae =

Scientific classification
- Kingdom: Animalia
- Phylum: Cnidaria
- Subphylum: Anthozoa
- Class: Octocorallia
- Order: Scleralcyonacea
- Superfamily: Pennatuloidea
- Family: Balticinidae; Gray, 1870

Family of corals

Balticinidae is a family of corals belonging to the superfamily Pennatuloidea.

Genera:

- Balticina Gray, 1870
