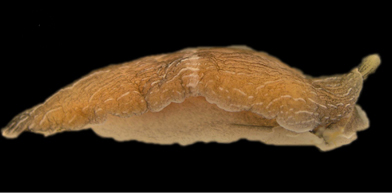

Scientific classification
- Domain: Eukaryota
- Kingdom: Animalia
- Phylum: Mollusca
- Class: Gastropoda
- Order: Nudibranchia
- Suborder: Cladobranchia
- Family: Arminidae
- Genus: Armina
- Species: A. neapolitana

Binomial name
- Armina neapolitana (delle Chiaje, 1824)

Synonyms
- Pleurophyllidia neapolitana delle Chiaje, 1824 (basionym); Pleurophyllidia vasconica Cuénot, 1914

= Armina neapolitana =

Species of gastropod

Armina neapolitana is a species of sea slug, a nudibranch, a marine gastropod mollusk in the family Arminidae.

== Distribution ==
This species occurs in European waters and in the Mediterranean Sea.
