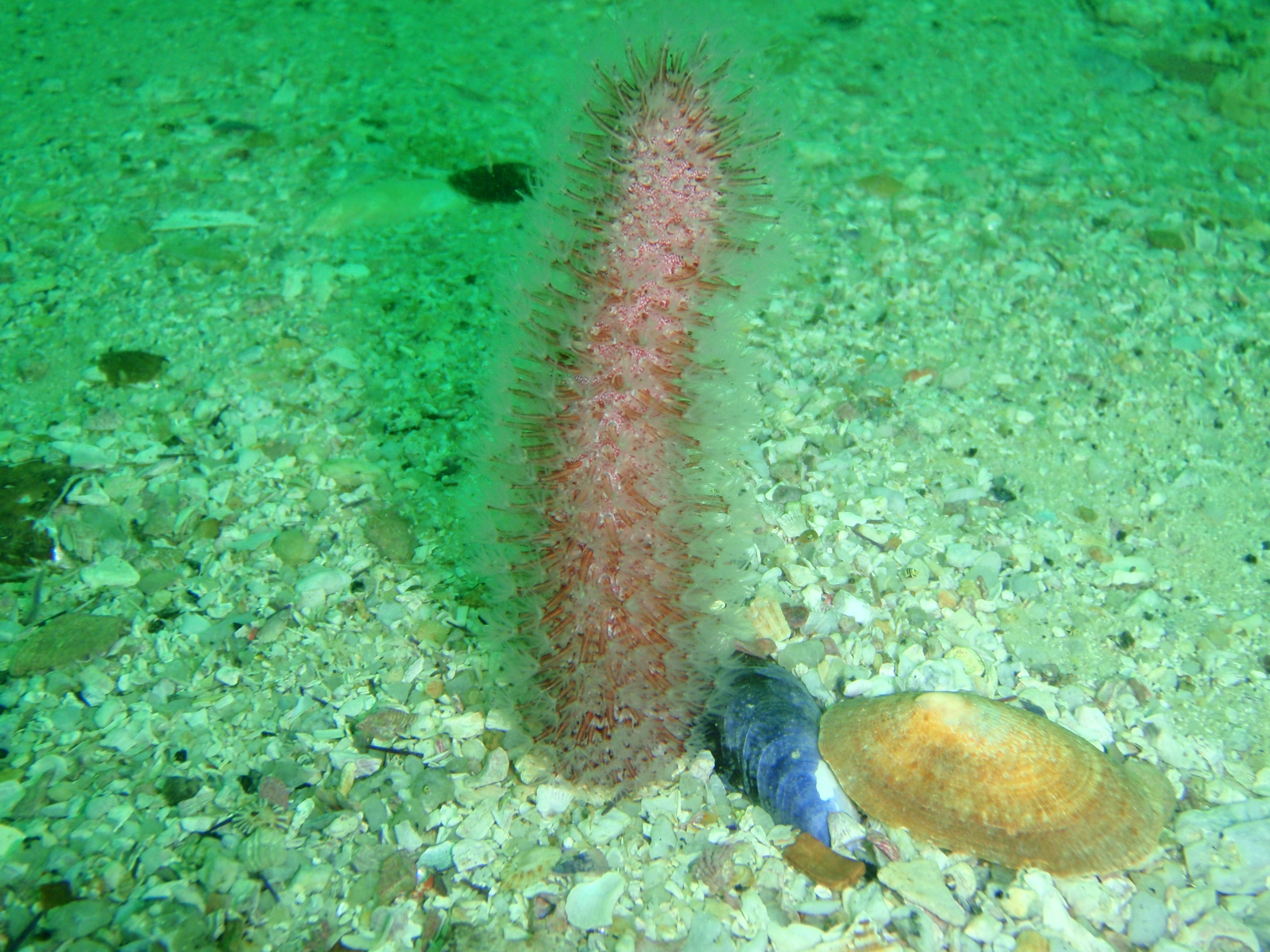
- Purple sea pen Actinoptilum molle off Windmill Beach in False Bay

Scientific classification
- Kingdom: Animalia
- Phylum: Cnidaria
- Subphylum: Anthozoa
- Class: Octocorallia
- Order: Scleralcyonacea
- Family: Echinoptilidae
- Genus: Actinoptilum; Kükenthal, 1911
- Species: A. molle

Binomial name
- Actinoptilum molle (Kükenthal, 1902)

= Actinoptilum =

Actinoptilum molle

Genus of sea pen

Actinoptilum is a genus of sea pen in the family Echinoptilidae. It is monotypic with a single species, Actinoptilum molle, commonly known as the radial sea pen or purple sea pen, which is found off the coasts of South Africa.

== Description ==
Colonies range in length up to at least 240mm, with a symmetrical slightly tapering round-tipped cylindrical rachis and a tapering peduncle of between one fifth and one third of the total length of the colony. The rachis is covered all round with dimorphic polyps, radially arranged with respect to the longitudinal axis. Siphonozoids are packed between the bases of the retractile autozooids, which have inconspicuous non-retractile bifurcated calyces. Colour is variable and permanent; individual colonies may be entirely reddish brown, pink or mauve, yellow, white or cream, or the rachis may be purple to reddish purple, with a yellow, white, pink or brownish peduncle. Metallic sheen when polyps retracted.

== Distribution and habitat ==
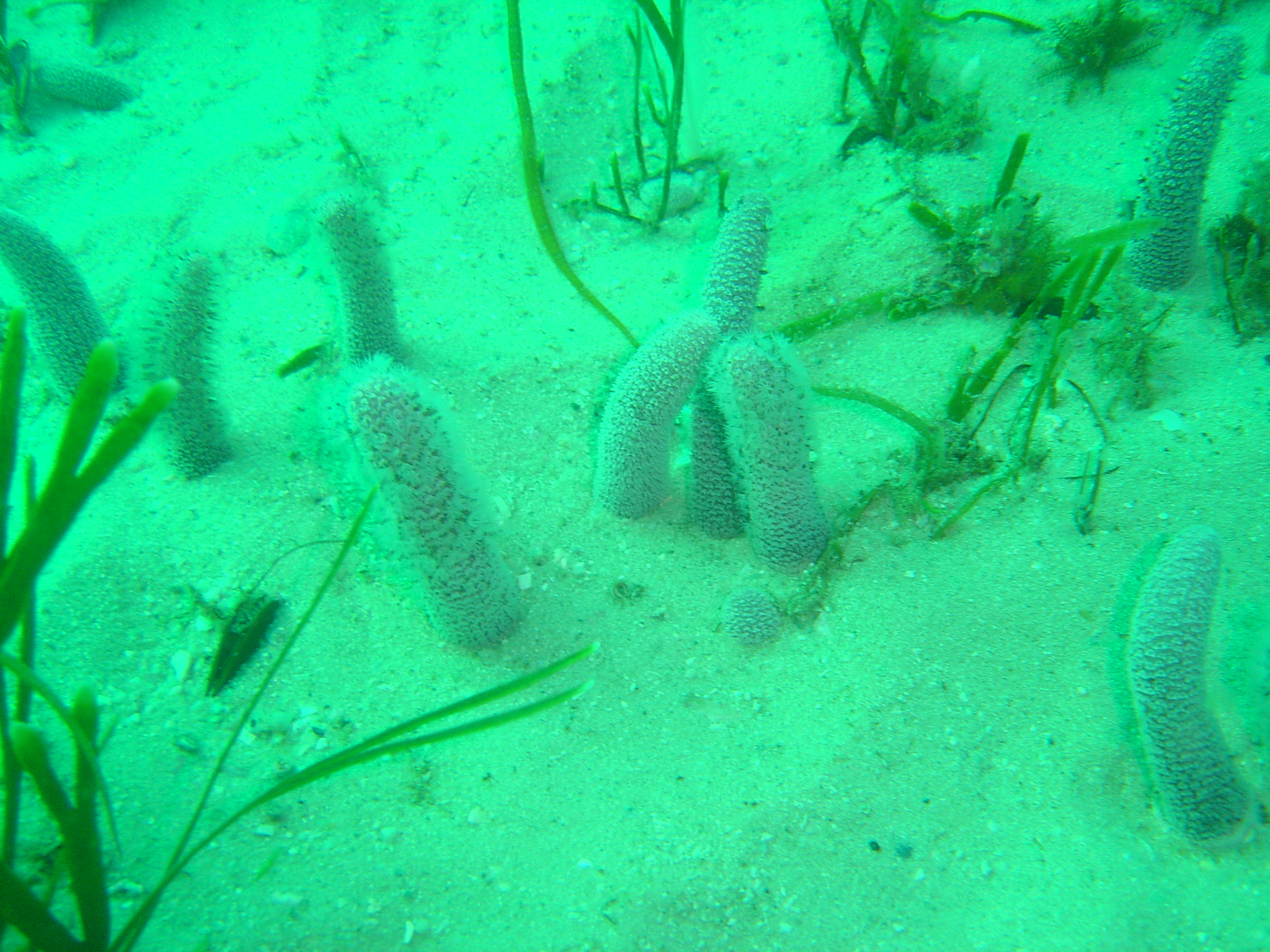
High population density

Probably southern African endemic. Range from Cape Columbine on the west coast of South Africa to Inhaca Island in Mozambique. Depth range from 12m to 333m. Reported from 200 to 333m off north eastern Madagascar. One of the most common pennatulaceans in South African coastal waters. Generally found in sand or silt bottoms, sometimes in sandy areas on rock substrate. Population density may be as high as 4 to 5 colonies per square metre.

== Behaviour and ecology ==
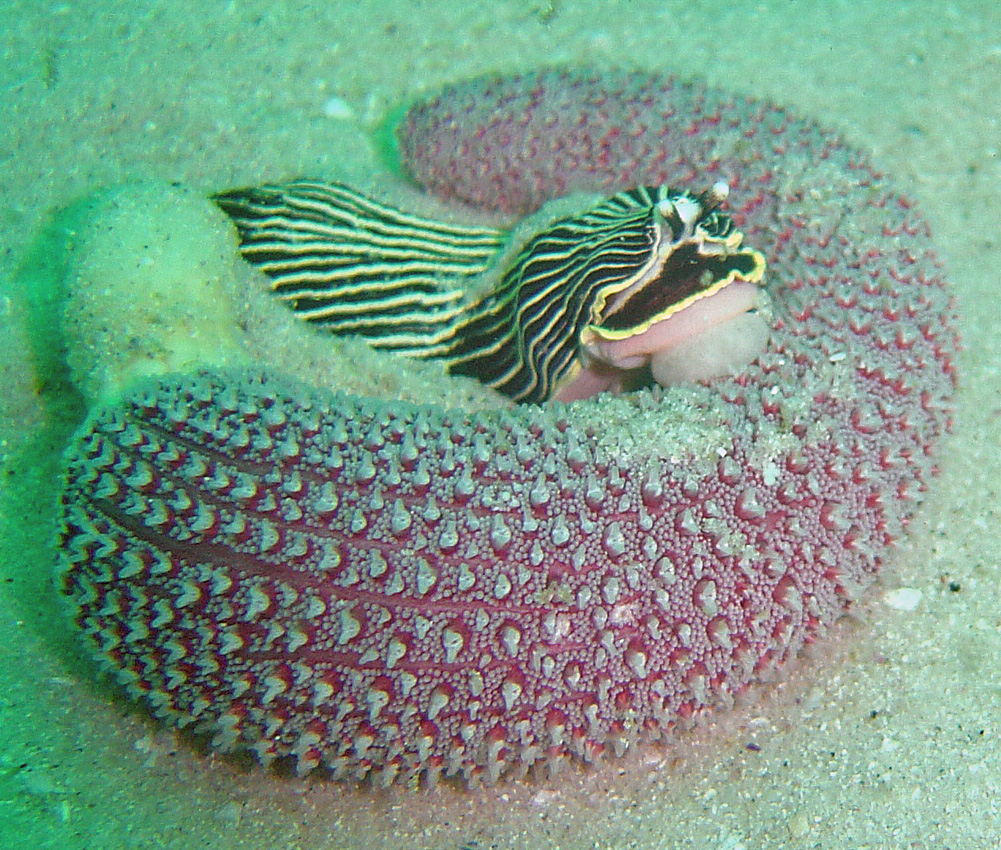
Pierre's armina feeding on an uprooted A. molle, Windmill beach offshore reef

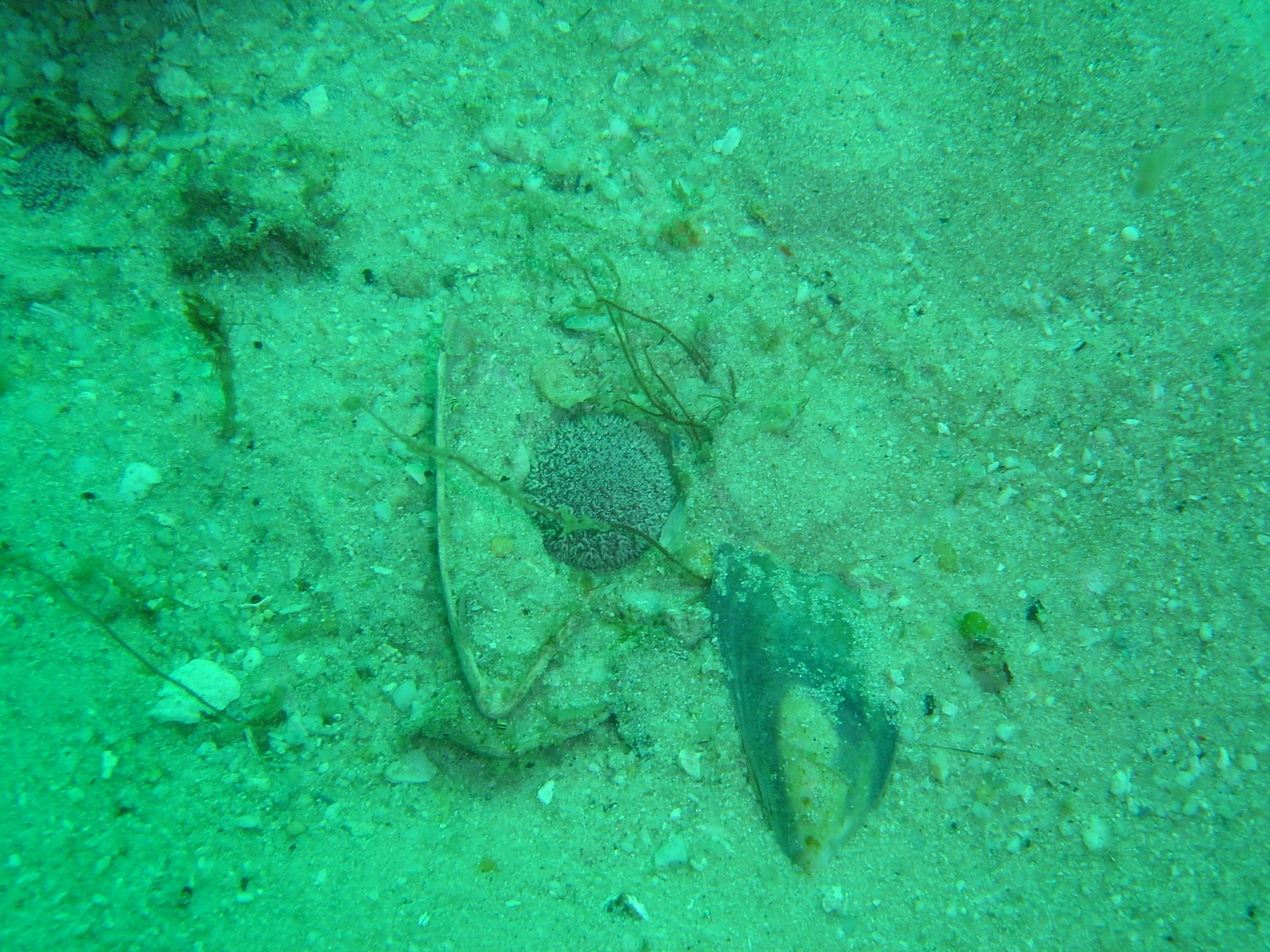
Purple sea pen deeply buried in sand

Predated on by Pierre's armina. The short peduncle is easily uprooted and specimens may be found lying loose on the sand after rough weather. They are also sometimes found almost entirely buried in the sand. It may exhibit bioluminescence when agitated.
