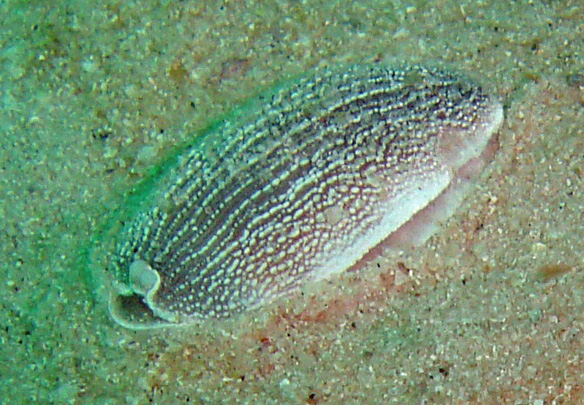

Scientific classification
- Domain: Eukaryota
- Kingdom: Animalia
- Phylum: Mollusca
- Class: Gastropoda
- Order: Nudibranchia
- Suborder: Cladobranchia
- Family: Arminidae
- Genus: Armina
- Species: A. gilchristi

Binomial name
- Armina gilchristi White, 1955

= Armina gilchristi =

Species of gastropod

Armina gilchristi is a species of sea slug, a nudibranch, a marine gastropod mollusk in the family Arminidae.

== Description ==
This species has a dark, grey and black mantle with longitudinal white, granulose ridges.

== Distribution ==
Armina gilchristi is endemic to the waters off Southern Africa.
