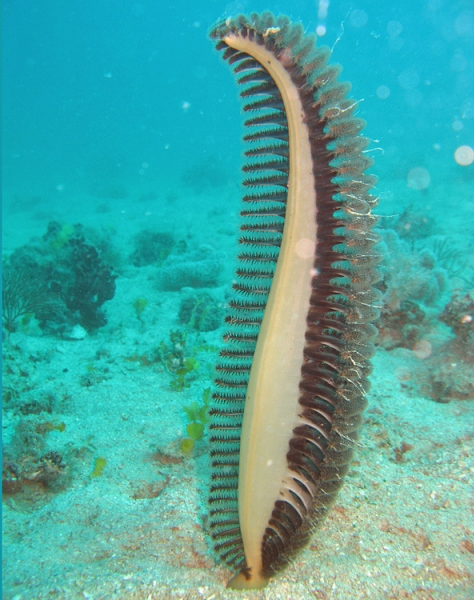
- Pteroeides sp.

Scientific classification
- Kingdom: Animalia
- Phylum: Cnidaria
- Subphylum: Anthozoa
- Class: Octocorallia
- Order: Scleralcyonacea
- Superfamily: Pennatuloidea
- Family: Pennatulidae; Ehrenberg, 1834 (or 1828)

Genera
- See text

= Pennatulidae =

Family of corals

Pennatulidae is a family of sea pens, a member of the subclass Octocorallia in the phylum Cnidaria.

== Genera ==
The World Register of Marine Species lists the following genera:

- Crassophyllum Tixier-Durivault, 1961
- Graphularia
- Gyrophyllum Studer, 1891
- Pennatula Linnaeus, 1758
- Pteroeides Herklots, 1858
- Ptilosarcus Verrill, 1865
- Sarcoptilus Gray, 1848

== See also ==
- Ptilosarcus gurneyi ("orange sea pen")
