= Funiculina =

Scientific classification
- Kingdom: Animalia
- Phylum: Cnidaria
- Subphylum: Anthozoa
- Class: Octocorallia
- Order: Scleralcyonacea
- Family: Funiculinidae
- Genus: Funiculina; Lamarck, 1816

Genus of corals

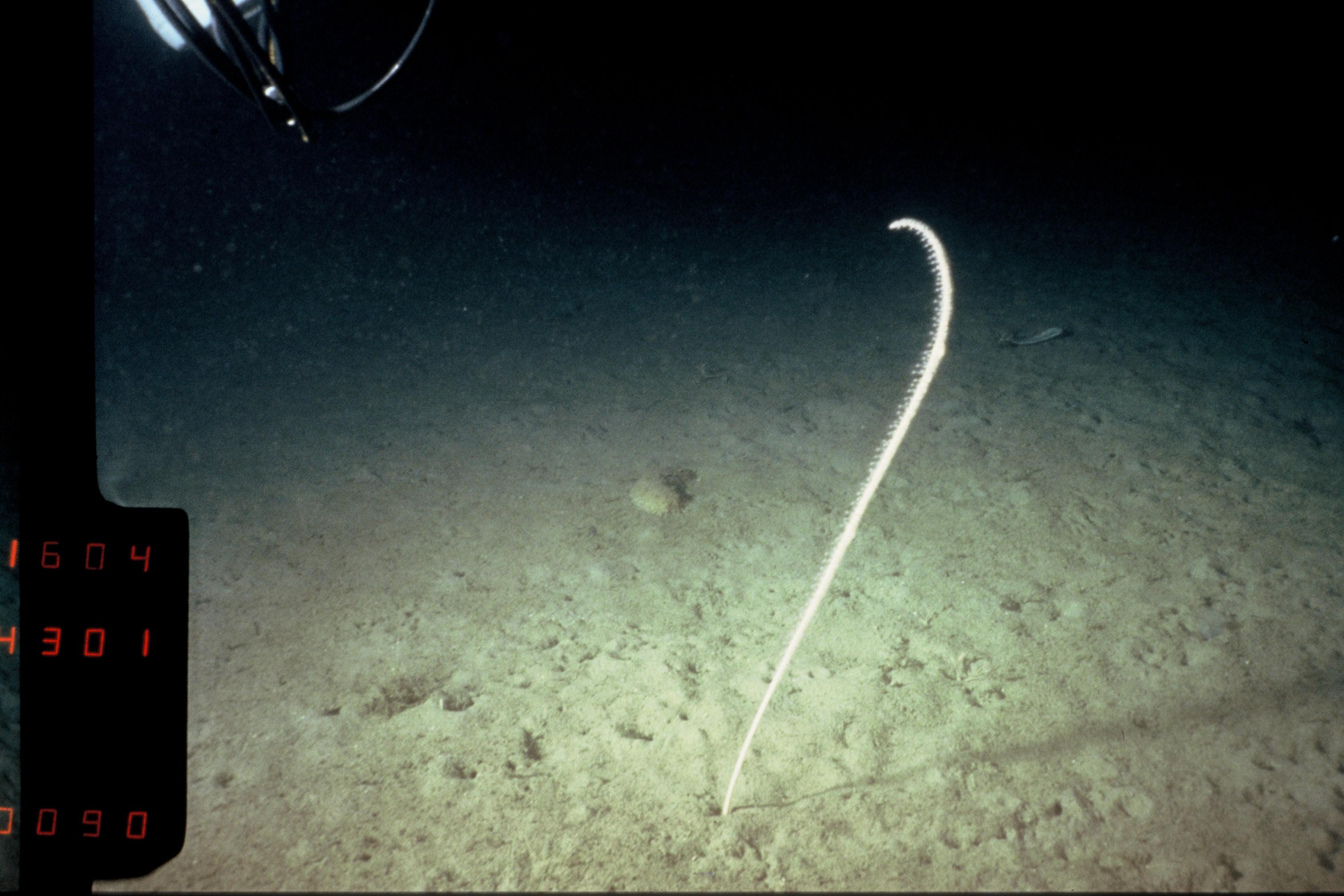

Funiculina is a genus of sea pens. It is the only genus in the family Funiculinidae. It contains three species:

- Funiculina armata Verrill, 1879
- Funiculina parkeri Kükenthal, 1909
- Funiculina quadrangularis (Pallas, 1766)
