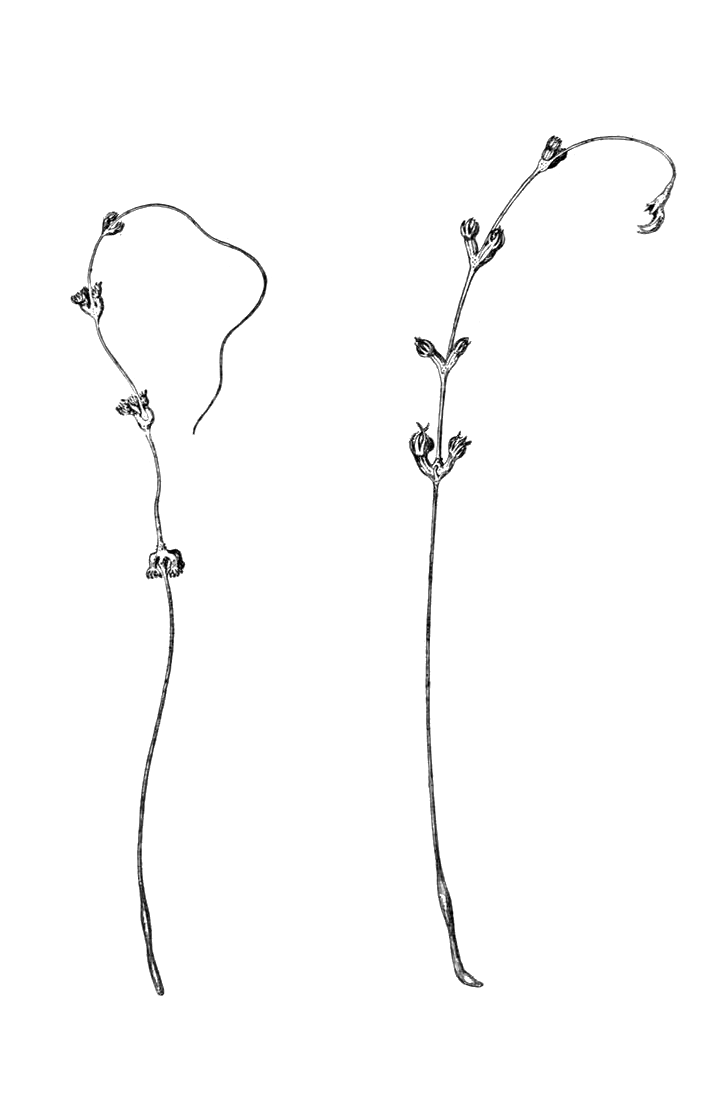
- Chunella gracillima (left) and Amphiacme abyssorum (right)

Scientific classification
- Kingdom: Animalia
- Phylum: Cnidaria
- Subphylum: Anthozoa
- Class: Octocorallia
- Order: Scleralcyonacea
- Family: Chunellidae
- Genus: Chunella; Kükenthal, 1902
- Species: C. gracillima

Binomial name
- Chunella gracillima Kükenthal, 1902

= Chunella =

Genus of corals

Chunella is a monotypic genus of corals belonging to the family Chunellidae. The only species is Chunella gracillima.

The species is found in Eastern Africa and Malesia.
