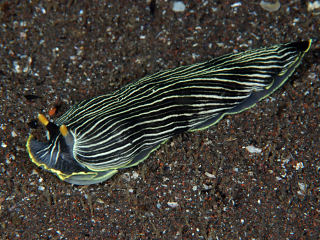

Scientific classification
- Kingdom: Animalia
- Phylum: Mollusca
- Class: Gastropoda
- Order: Nudibranchia
- Suborder: Cladobranchia
- Family: Arminidae
- Genus: Armina
- Species: A. major

Binomial name
- Armina major Baba, 1949

= Armina major =

Species of gastropod

Armina major is a species of sea slug, a nudibranch, a marine gastropod mollusk in the family Arminidae.
