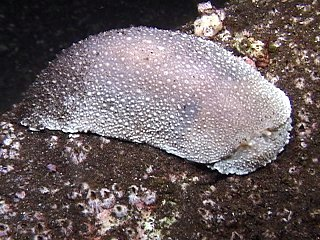

Scientific classification
- Domain: Eukaryota
- Kingdom: Animalia
- Phylum: Mollusca
- Class: Gastropoda
- Order: Nudibranchia
- Suborder: Cladobranchia
- Family: Arminidae
- Genus: Armina
- Species: A. babai

Binomial name
- Armina babai (Tchang, 1934)

Synonyms
- Linguella babai Tchang, 1934

= Armina babai =

Species of gastropod

Armina babai is a species of sea slug, a nudibranch, a marine gastropod mollusk in the family Arminidae.

== Description ==
Armina babai grows to 50 mm in length and appears flattened, elongated, and narrow posteriorly. It has a yellow sole and smooth mantle. Longitudinal ridges are absent, as is other ornamentation. The body itself appears ashy to whitish grey and is translucent. There are two big spots on the notum that are purplish. The head veil is an ashy colour and has papillae that are dark brown. The anterior gills are yellowish white while the posterior gills appear dark purple. The viscera are pinkish in colour which sometimes show through the body. In some specimens, there are yellowish brown smudges that can be seen around the edge of the mantle.

== Distribution ==
This species is found in the waters of Pakistan, India, China, and Japan.

== Behaviour ==
Armina babai may emit a potent medicinal odor when handled.
