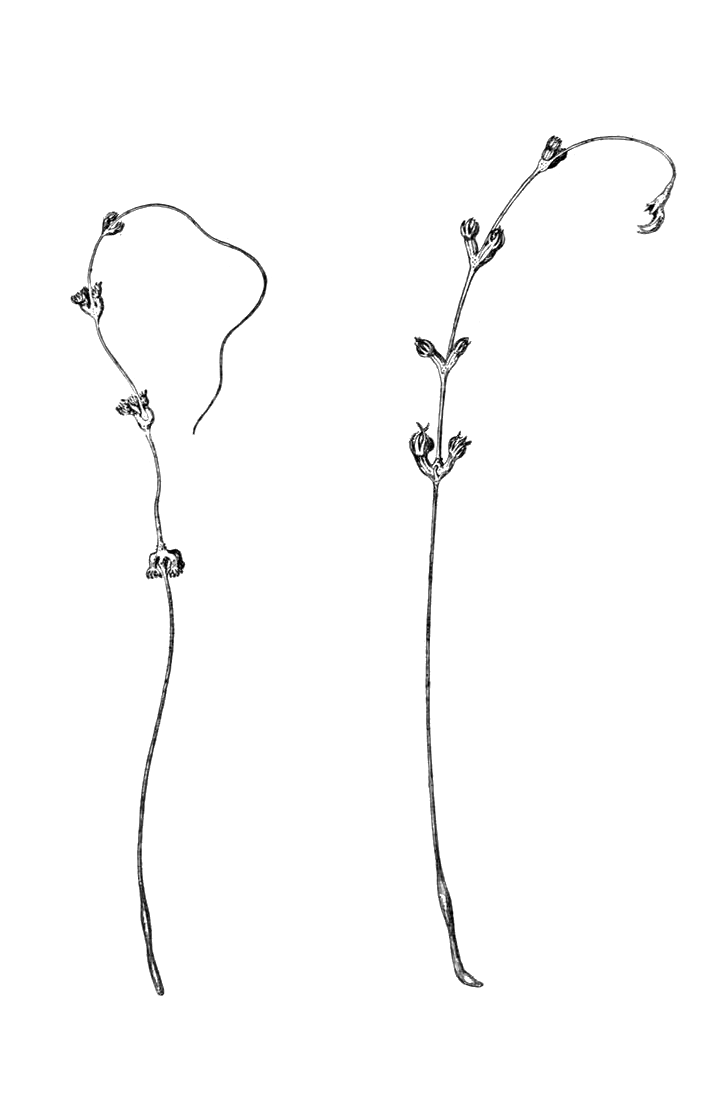
- A drawing of two chunellid sea pens: Chunella gracillima (left) and Amphiacme abyssorum (right)

Scientific classification
- Kingdom: Animalia
- Phylum: Cnidaria
- Subphylum: Anthozoa
- Class: Octocorallia
- Order: Scleralcyonacea
- Superfamily: Pennatuloidea
- Family: Chunellidae

Genera
- See text

= Chunellidae =

Family of corals

Chunellidae is a family of sea pens, a member of the subclass Octocorallia in the phylum Cnidaria.

== Genera ==
The World Register of Marine Species list the following genera:

- Amphiacme Kükenthal, 1903
- Chunella Kükenthal, 1902
- Porcupinella López-González & Williams, 2011
