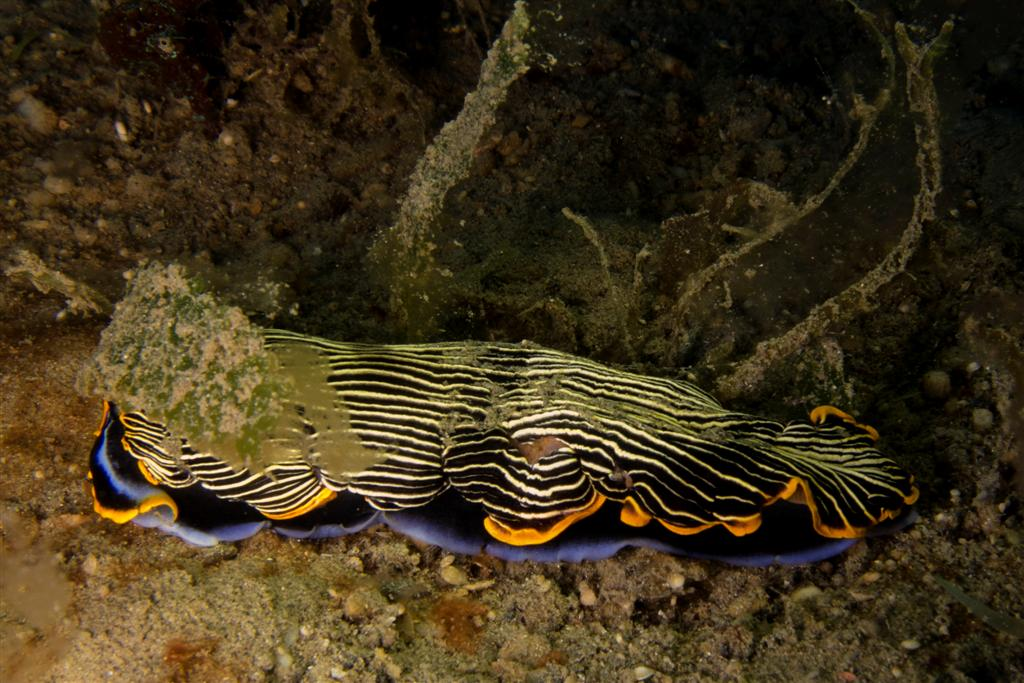

Scientific classification
- Kingdom: Animalia
- Phylum: Mollusca
- Class: Gastropoda
- Order: Nudibranchia
- Suborder: Cladobranchia
- Family: Arminidae
- Genus: Armina
- Species: A. semperi

Binomial name
- Armina semperi (Bergh, 1861)

Synonyms
- Pleurophyllidia semperi Bergh, 1861 (basionym)

= Armina semperi =

Species of gastropod

Armina semperi is a species of sea slug, a nudibranch, a marine gastropod mollusk in the family Arminidae.

There is one variety Armina semperi var. erythraea Pruvot-Fol, 1933

== Description ==
This species can be identified by the thin black and white ridges that run longitudinally down its back. The animal also has a characteristic light-blue foot rimmed in yellow-orange, with a matching oral veil.

Members of this species are generally between 2-6 centimeters long, with narrow bodies.

== Life habits ==
Individuals of Armina semperi are more likely to be active at night.

They generally eat soft corals and sea pens.

A picture of Armina semperi can be viewed on the online "Sea Slug Forum" website.
