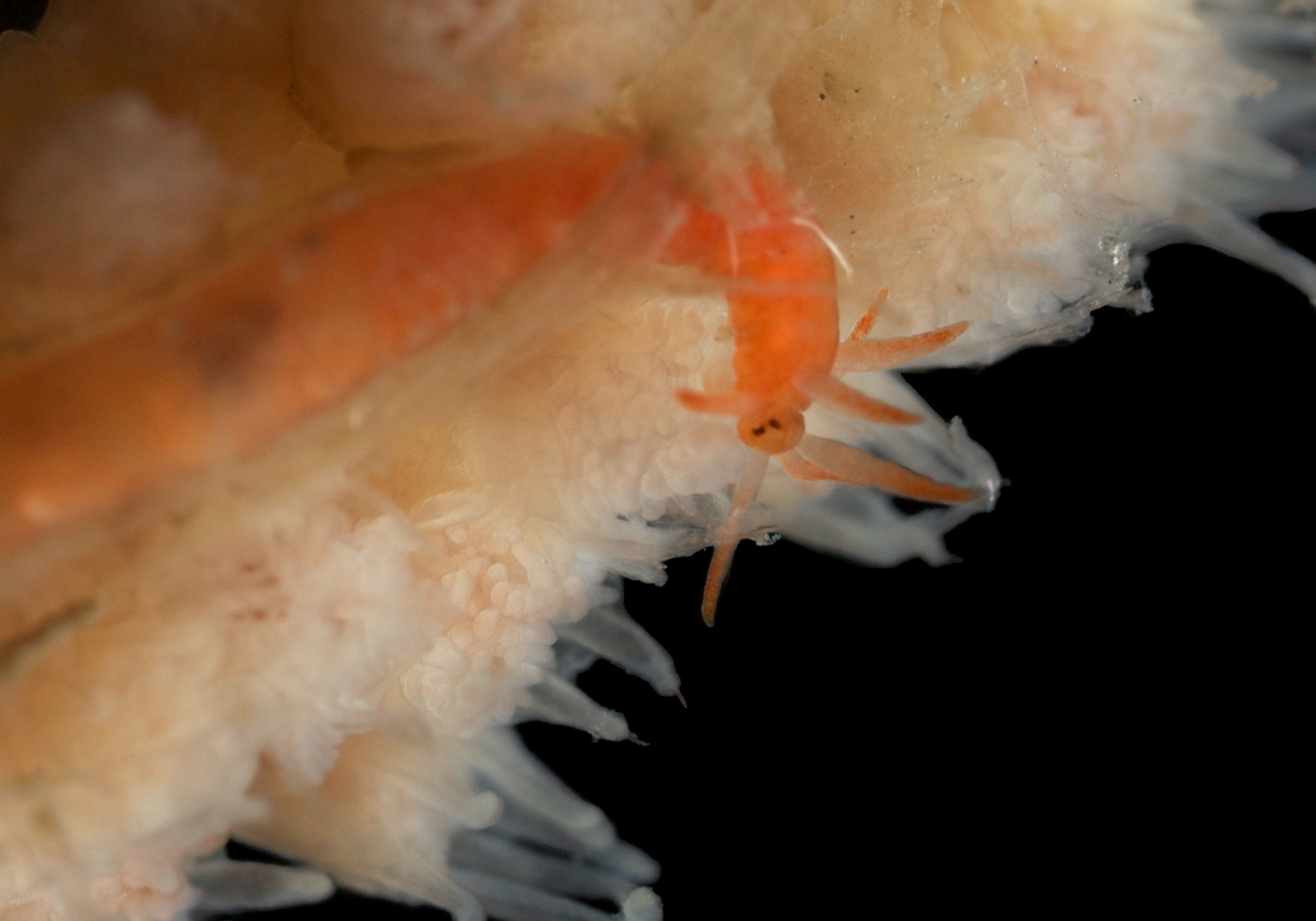
- Imajimaea draculai on F. quadrangularis

Conservation status
- Near Threatened (IUCN 3.1)

Scientific classification
- Kingdom: Animalia
- Phylum: Cnidaria
- Subphylum: Anthozoa
- Class: Octocorallia
- Order: Scleralcyonacea
- Family: Funiculinidae
- Genus: Funiculina
- Species: F. quadrangularis

Binomial name
- Funiculina quadrangularis (Pallas, 1766)

= Funiculina quadrangularis =

Species of sea pen

Funiculina quadrangularis, commonly known as tall sea pen, is an uncommon cold water coral within the Family Funiculinidae. It is named tall sea pen because it looks like a quill sticking in the bottom of the sea. It forms habitat for several key crustacean species.

== Morphology ==
F. quadrangularis's appearance is often described as feather-like. More specifically, they look like a quill sticking in the seabed. They are anchored by a peduncle as its base and they have a calcareous axial rod growing upward with polyps arising from it. Each polyps has eight tentacles. They can grow up to 2 meters with up to a quarter of the axis embedded in the sediment.

== Distribution ==
The tall sea pen can be found globally. They are most commonly found in sea lochs and open waters of the northwest coast of Scotland, mainly found with a depth below 20m to 2000m. They have a patchy distribution around the UK, on the northwest coast of Scotland and Ireland. They are also distributed in coastal waters of the North Atlantic and Mediterranean, New Zealand, Japan and the Gulf of Mexico. However, the abundance of this specie is low due to the high trawling intensity.

== Reproduction ==
The tall sea pan is dioecious, which means that they have the male and females reproductive organs in separate individuals. The females will develop one oocyte each time throughout the year. With a sex ratio of 1:1 of males to females in a population, spawning occurs in the midwinter. They have a large pool of offspring with a survival rate of about 10%. It is still unclear why they have this distinct patter of oogenesis and winter spawning. Some are guessing that it is due to the influence of environmental cues and this tall sea pen's deep-sea habitat. Since the distribution and sensitivity to bottom fishing activities is very limited, tall sea pen reduce in population number which may lead to genetic isolation and reduced diversity.

== Ecological role ==
Sea pens are home to many secondary polyps that are either specialized in either feeding or water intake. They are associated with the brittle star Asteronyx lovenii, and their colonies have been observed as a nurseries for fish larvae.

== Threats ==
The greatest threat to the survival of F. quadrangularis colonies is demersal fishing activities. This species has very limited distribution that it is restricted to the deep basins, sensitivity to bottom fishing activities, and low resilience to physical disturbance which make them vulnerable to fishing activities. Trawling often happens at places where Norway lobsters and shrimps are present; F. quadrangularis is a typical species of essential habitat for these species. Since F. quadrangularis has a rigid axial rod that is unable to withdraw into the sediment unlike other UK sea pen species, bottom trawling would cause F. quadrangularis significant physical disturbance. As a result, F. quadrangularis is decreasing in population numbers which may lead them to genetic isolation and reduced diversity. However, F. quadrangularis can have resilience to human impacts if distant populations have a high connectivity since they could have a higher genetic diversity and a higher geneflow.

== Conservation ==
F. quadrangularis is considered to be nationally rare and are a high conservation significance species.

=== In the UK ===
The tall sea pen is a Species of Principal Importance under the Natural Environment and Rural Communities Act, 2006, UK. It is also on the Biodiversity Action Plan list of Priority Species.

=== In Mediterranean ===
The tall sea pen is a sensitive and essential fish habitat since it forms habitat for several commercially important crustaceans.
