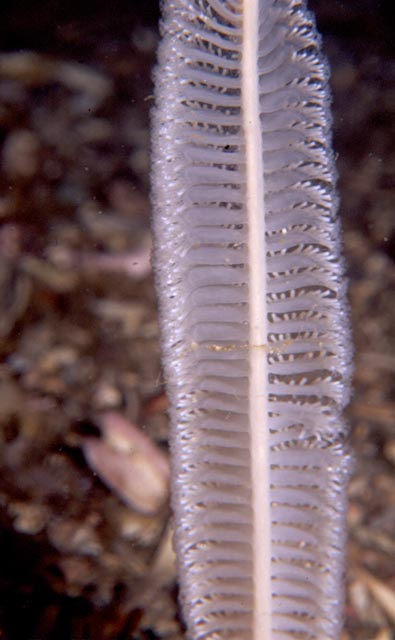
- feathery sea pen

Scientific classification
- Kingdom: Animalia
- Phylum: Cnidaria
- Subphylum: Anthozoa
- Class: Octocorallia
- Order: Scleralcyonacea
- Superfamily: Pennatuloidea
- Family: Virgulariidae; Verrill, 1868

Genera
- See text

= Virgulariidae =

Family of corals

Virgulariidae is a family of sea pens, a member of the subclass Octocorallia in the phylum Cnidaria.

== Characteristics ==
Colonies are bilateral, long and slender to very slender. The colony axis is noticeable and present throughout.

== Genera ==
The World Register of Marine Species lists the following genera:

- Acanthoptilum Kölliker, 1870
- Grasshoffia Williams, 2015
- Scytaliopsis Gravier, 1906
- Scytalium Herklots, 1858
- Stylatula Verrill, 1864
- Virgularia Lamarck, 1816
