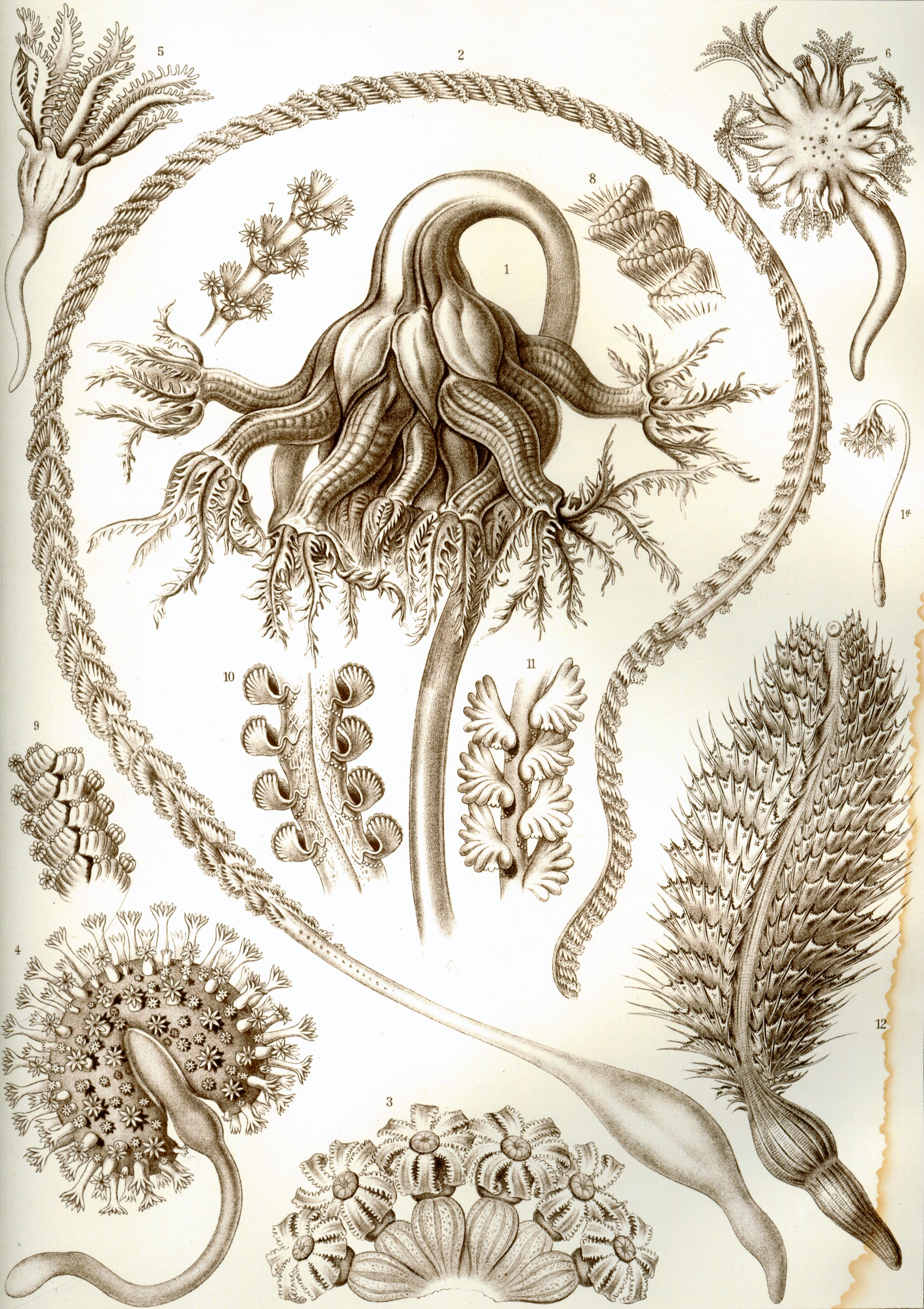
- "Pennatulida" from Ernst Haeckel's Kunstformen der Natur, 1904

Scientific classification
- Kingdom: Animalia
- Phylum: Cnidaria
- Subphylum: Anthozoa
- Class: Octocorallia
- Order: Scleralcyonacea
- Superfamily: Pennatuloidea; Ehrenberg, 1834

Families
- see text

= Sea pen =

Sea pen Temporal range: Cambrian–Recent

Order of colonial marine cnidarians

Sea pens are marine cnidarians belonging to the superfamily Pennatuloidea. They are fleshy colonial organisms anchored to the seabed, with tiny polyps embedded in a soft matrix. They have a cosmopolitan distribution, being found in tropical and temperate waters worldwide, from intertidal shallow waters to deep seas of more than 6,100 m (20,000 ft).

The earliest accepted sea pen fossils are known from the Cambrian-aged Burgess Shale (Thaumaptilon). Similar fossils from the Ediacaran may show the dawn of sea pens. Precisely what these early fossils are, however, is not decided.

== Taxonomy ==
Sea pens are marine cnidarians belonging to the superfamily Pennatuloidea, which are colony-forming benthic filter feeders within the order Scleralcyonacea. The order comprises 16 families and 44 extant genera, with around 235 accepted species. The superfamily Pennatulacea consists of the following families:

- Anthoptilidae Kölliker, 1880
- Balticinidae Balss, 1910
- Chunellidae Kükenthal, 1902
- Echinoptilidae Hubrecht, 1885
- Funiculinidae Gray, 1870
- Gyrophyllidae López-González,Drewery & Williams, 2022
- Kophobelemnidae Gray, 1860
- Pennatulidae Ehrenberg, 1834
- Protoptilidae Kölliker, 1872
- Pseudumbellulidae López-González in López-González & Drewery, 2022
- Renillidae Gray, 1870
- Scleroptilidae Jungersen, 1904
- Stachyptilidae Kölliker, 1880
- Umbellulidae Lindahl, 1874 (1840)
- Veretillidae Herklots, 1858
- Virgulariidae Verrill, 1868

== Biology ==
Due to their wide geographic distribution and long evolutionary history, genetic variation within the different species of sea pen is quite large. Throughout evolution, most sea pens have kept their original mitochondrial gene order, but a certain clade of sea pens shown unique rearrangements through ancestral state reconstruction. There are many populations of sea pens found in mainly Indian waters. It is their polyps that are affected genetically, as they have dispersed within the different waters and islands, and how they use their polyps (tentacles) to protect themselves and other species.

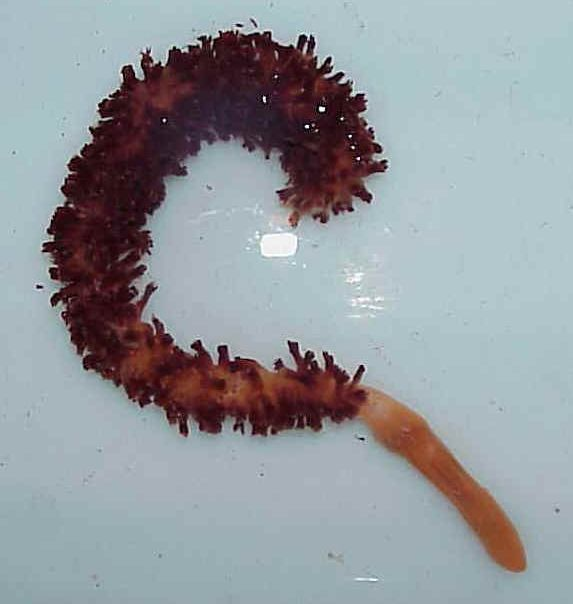
Uprooted sea pen with the bulbous peduncle in view

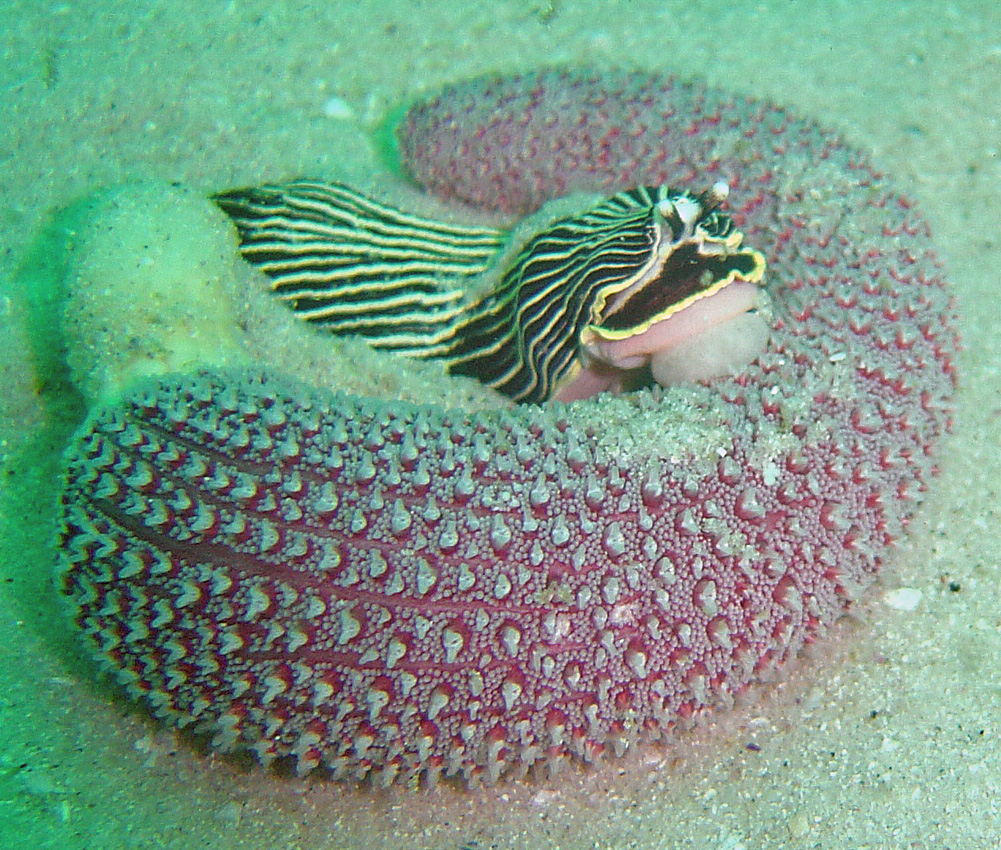
Pierre's armina feeding on purple sea pen

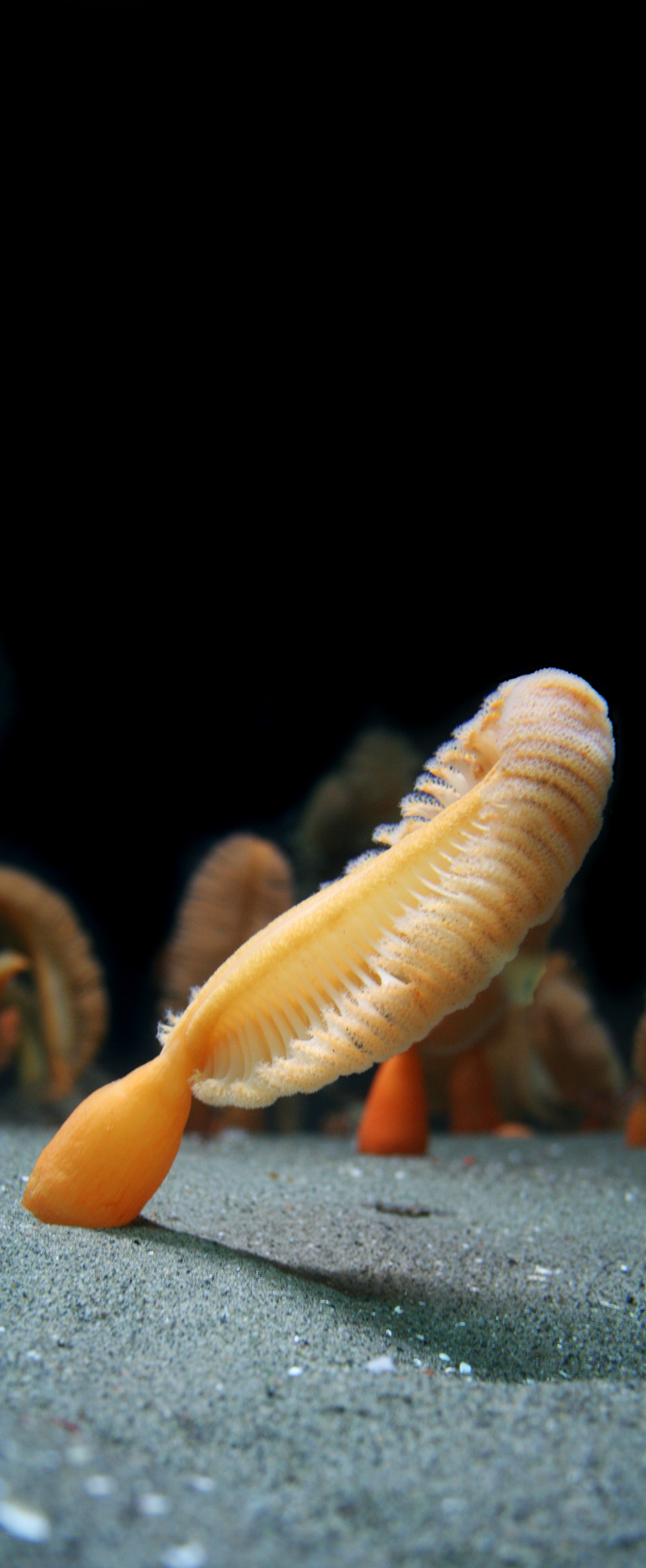
Sea pen at Vancouver Aquarium

As octocorals, sea pens are colonial animals with multiple polyps (which look somewhat like miniature sea anemones), each with eight tentacles. Unlike other octocorals, however, a sea pen's polyps are specialized to specific functions: a single polyp develops into a rigid, erect stalk (the rachis) and loses its tentacles, forming a bulbous "root" or peduncle at its base. The other polyps branch out from this central stalk, forming water intake structures (siphonozooids), feeding structures (autozooids) with nematocysts, and reproductive structures. The entire colony is fortified by calcium carbonate in the form of spicules and a central axial rod.

Using their root-like peduncles to anchor themselves in sandy or muddy substrate, the exposed portion of sea pens may rise up to 2 metres (6.6 ft) in some species, such as the tall sea pen (Funiculina quadrangularis). Sea pens are sometimes brightly coloured; the orange sea pen (Ptilosarcus gurneyi) is a notable example. Rarely found above depths of 10 metres (33 ft), sea pens prefer deeper waters where turbulence is less likely to uproot them. Some species may inhabit depths of 2,000 metres (6,600 ft) or more.

While generally sessile animals, sea pens are able to relocate and re-anchor themselves if need be. They position themselves favourably in the path of currents, ensuring a steady flow of plankton, the sea pens' chief source of food. Their primary predators are nudibranchs and sea stars, some of which feed exclusively on sea pens. The sea pens' ability to be clumped together and spatially unpredictable hinders sea stars' predation abilities. When touched, some sea pens emit a bright greenish light; this is known as bioluminescence. They may also force water out of their bodies for defence, rapidly deflating and retreating into their peduncle.

Like other anthozoans, sea pens reproduce by coordinating a release of sperm and eggs into the water column; this may occur seasonally or throughout the year. Fertilized eggs develop into larvae called planulae which drift freely for about a week before settling on the substrate. Mature sea pens provide shelter for other animals, such as juvenile fish. Analysis of rachis growth rings indicates sea pens may live for 100 years or more, if the rings are indeed annual in nature.

Some sea pens exhibit glide reflection symmetry, rare among extant animals.

== Aquarium trade ==
Sea pens are sometimes sold in the aquarium trade. However, they are generally hard to care for because they need a very deep substrate and have special food requirements.

== Gallery ==
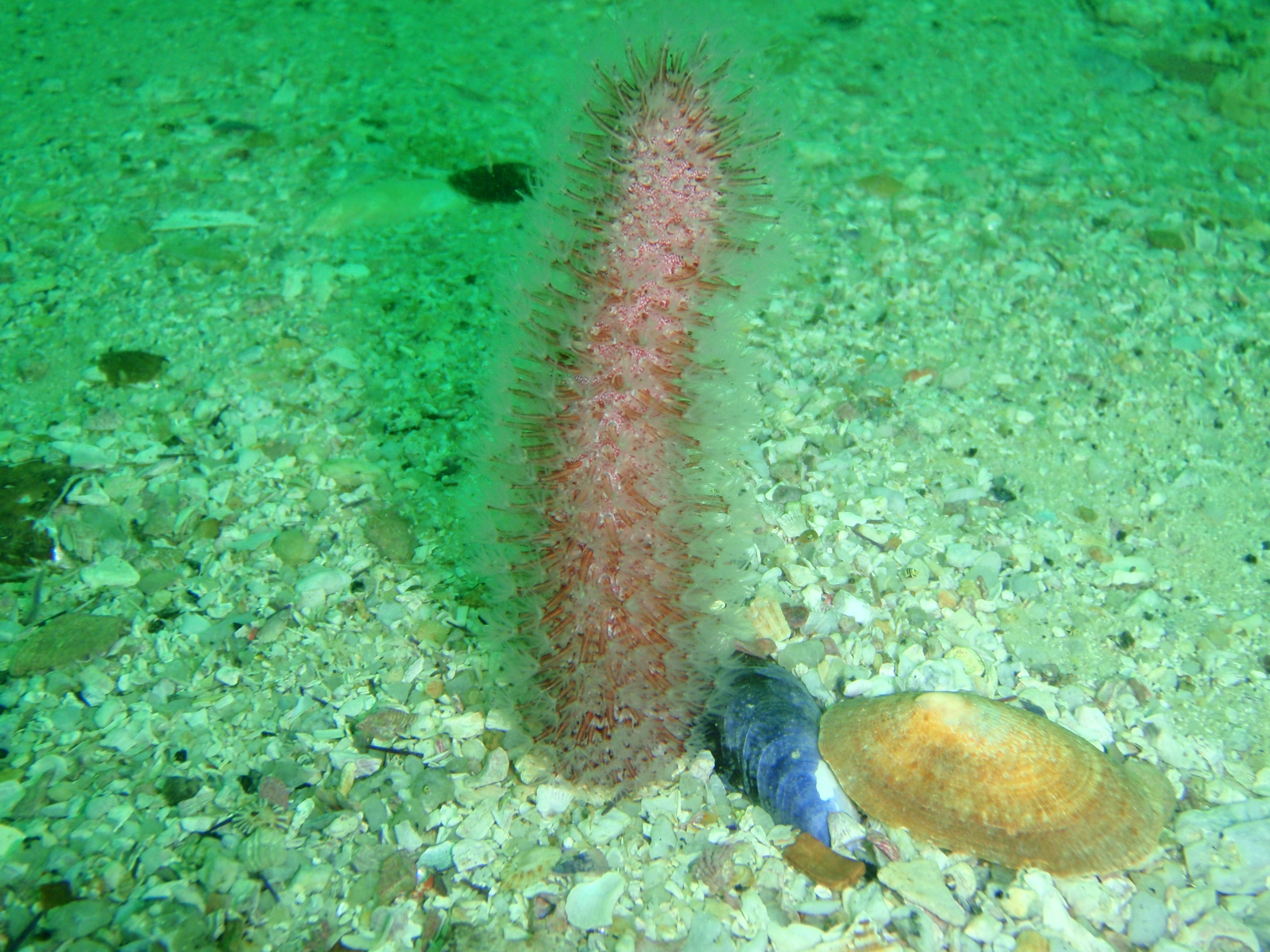
Actinoptilum molle (Echinoptilidae)

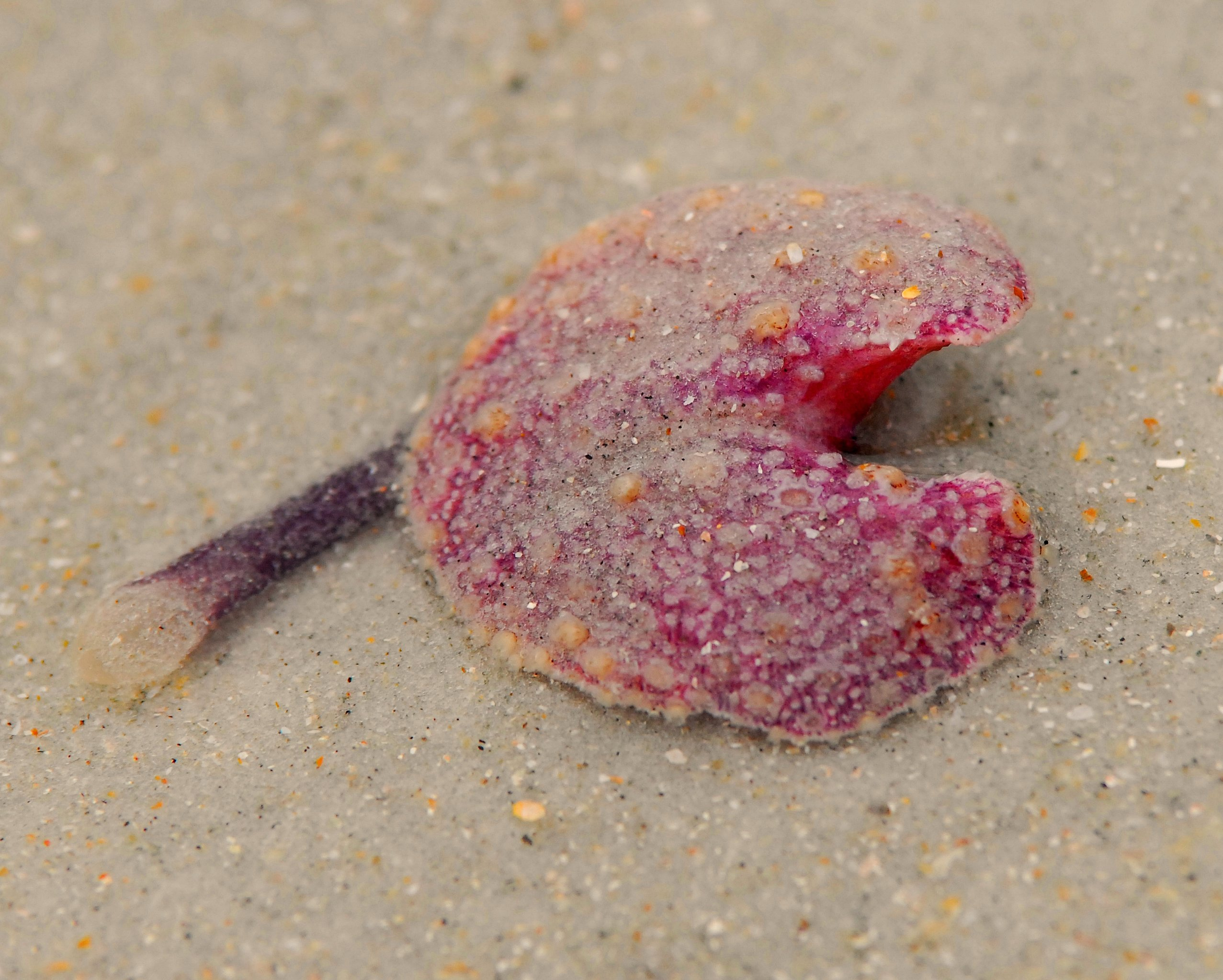
Renilla sp. (Renillidae)

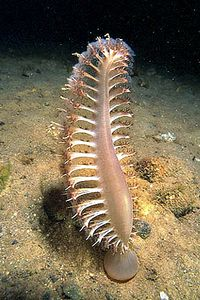
Pennatula phosphorea (Pennatulidae)

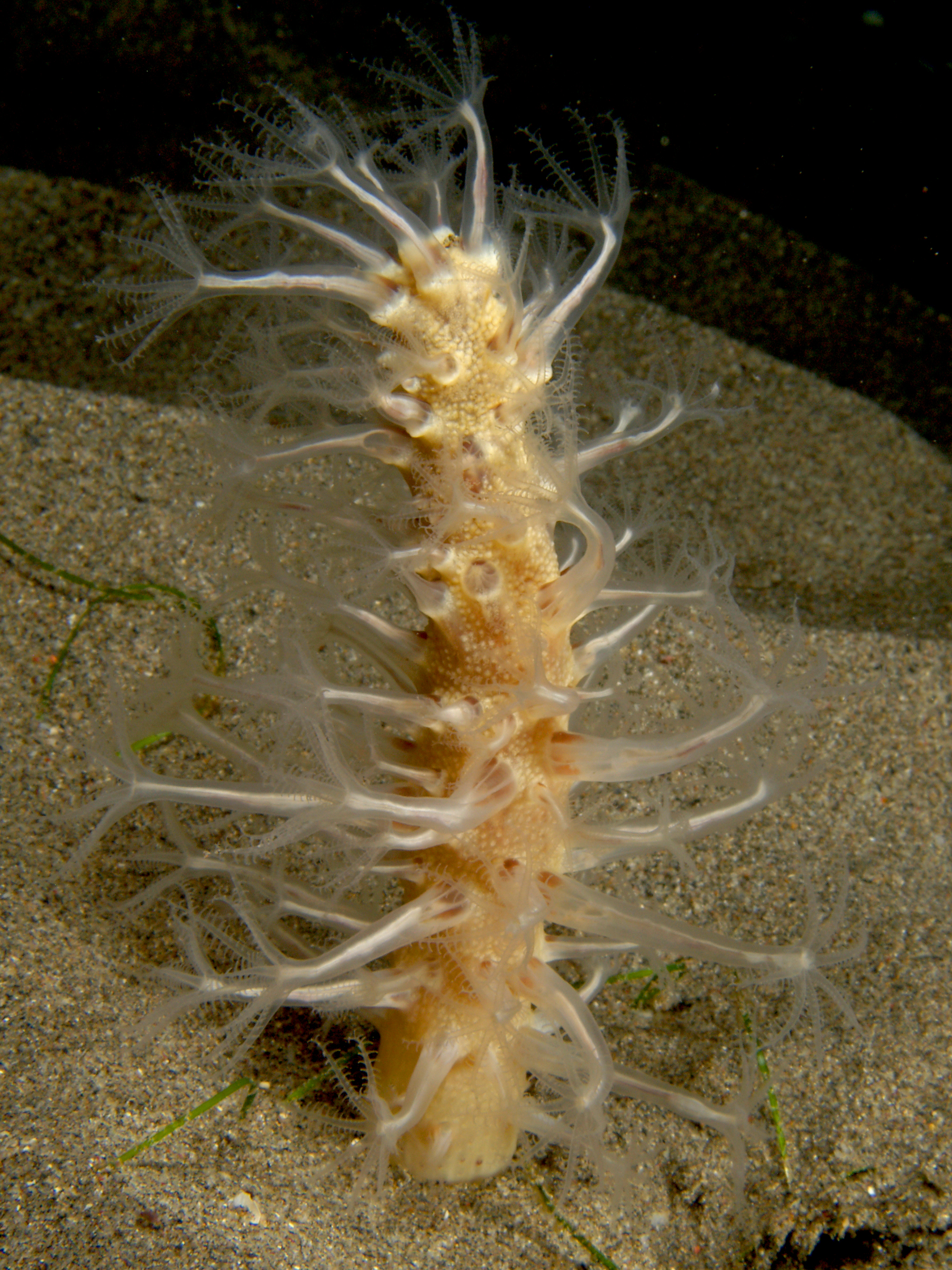
Veretillum sp. (Veretillidae)

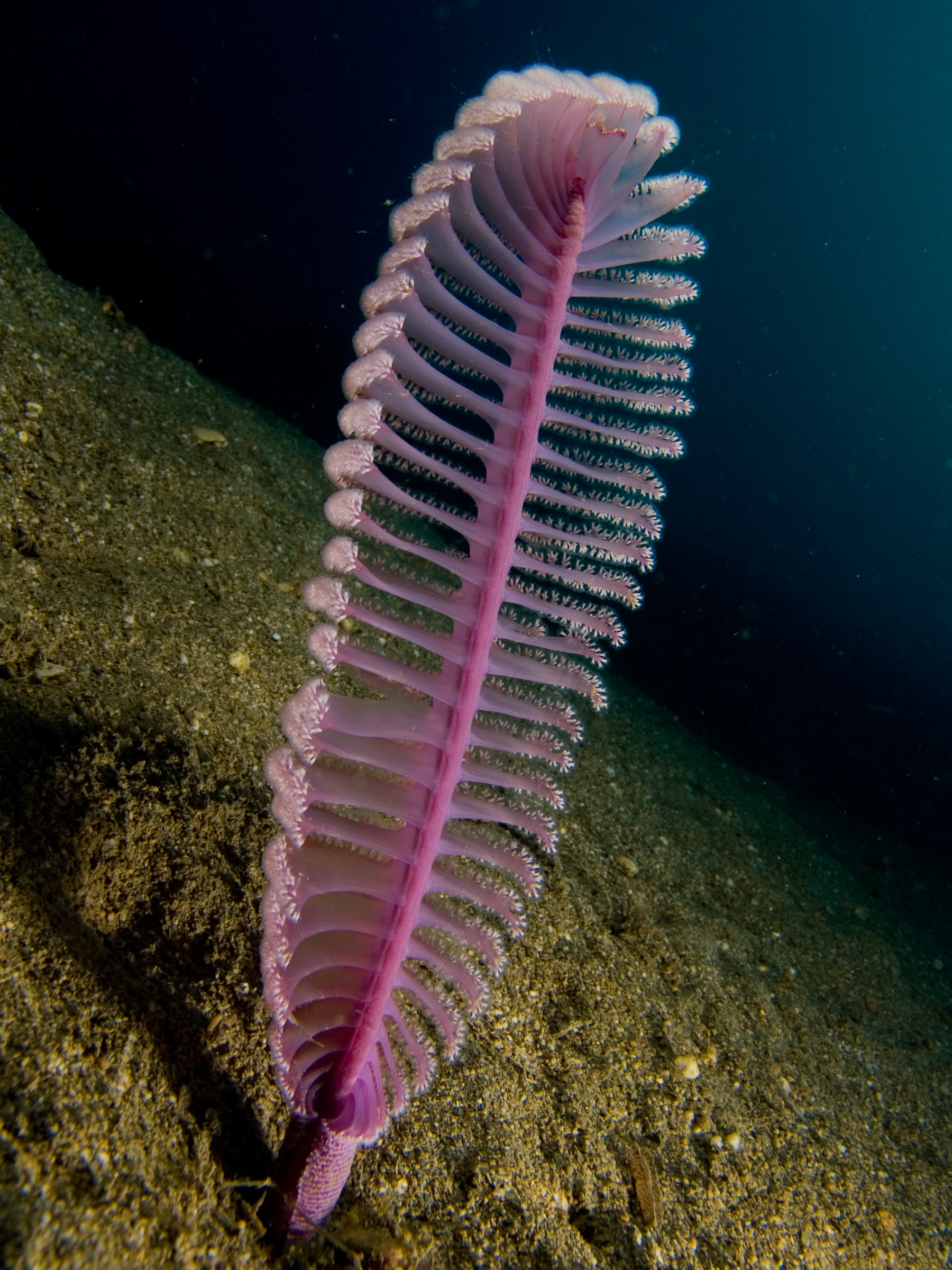
Virgularia sp. (Virgulariidae)
