= Thora Whitehead =

Australian malacologist (1936–2021)

- Born: 27 January 1936; Chile
- Died: 30 September 2021 (aged 85); Brisbane, Queensland, Australia
- Known for: Conchology

Thora Patricia Whitehead (27 January 1936 – 30 September 2021) was an Australian scientific collector and malacologist. She collected more than 200,000 shell specimens which are now held in the Queensland Museum.

== Life and work ==
With Kevin Lamprell, Whitehead co-wrote the two-volume Bivalves of Australia. She also edited Lamprell's book, Spondylus: Spiny oyster shells of the world, in 1986.

Whitehead spent over 50 years collecting shells, particularly along the coast of Queensland. She found specimens in mangrove forests and on beaches, rocky outcrops and coral reefs.

In the process of photographing the specimens prior to acquisition of Whitehead's extensive shell collection by the Queensland Museum, its curator John Healy discovered a new species. He named it Amoria thorae in her honour.

== Personal life ==
Born in Chile in 1936, Whitehead died in Brisbane in 2021 aged 85. She was survived by John, her husband of 56 years, and three children.

== Legacy ==
A number of species were named in her honour, including Amoria thorae, Callocardia thorae, Conus whiteheadae, Morula whiteheadae, Nassarius whiteheadae and Terebra whiteheadae.
