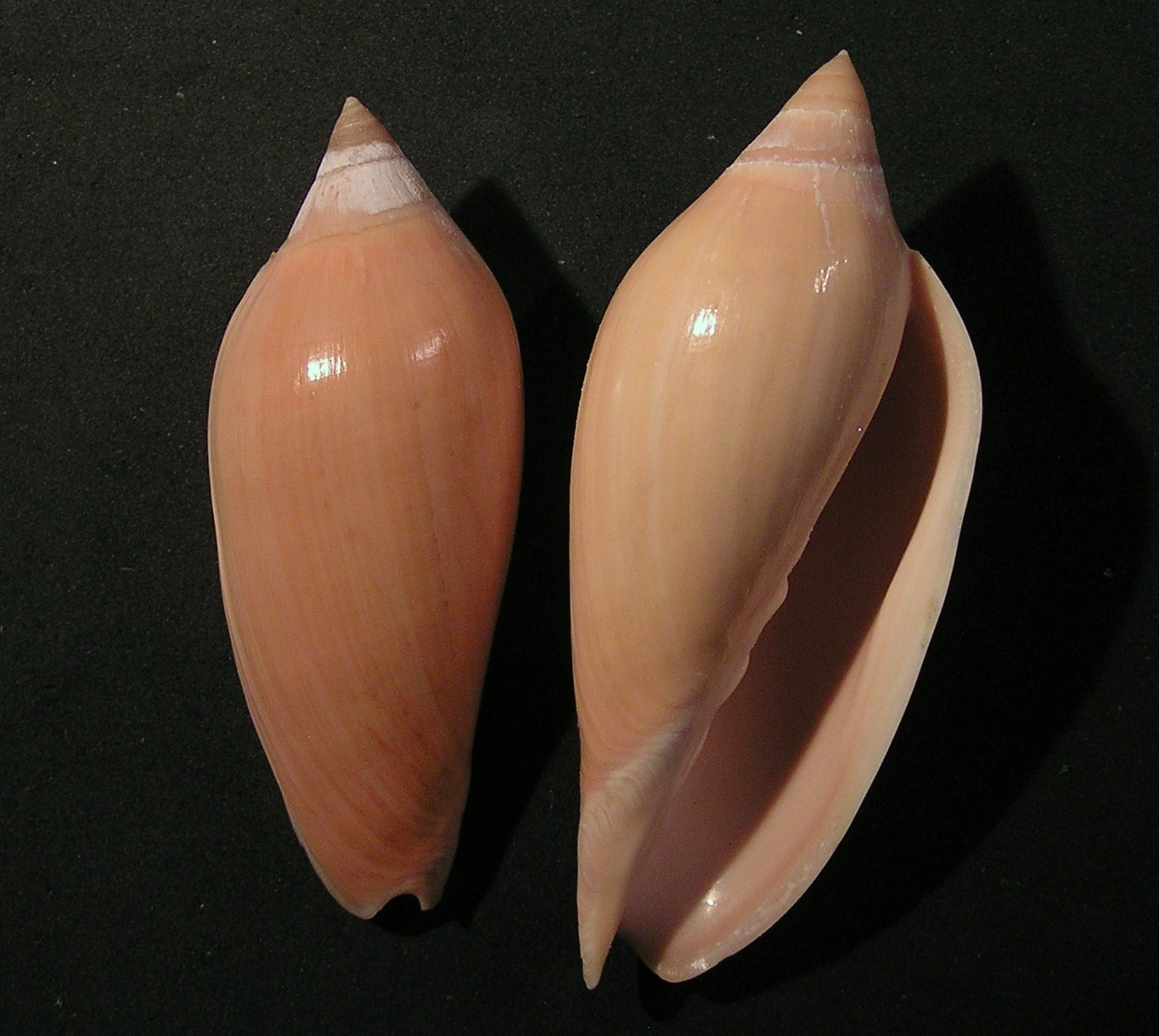
- Several views of a shell of Amoria molleri

Scientific classification
- Kingdom: Animalia
- Phylum: Mollusca
- Class: Gastropoda
- Subclass: Caenogastropoda
- Order: Neogastropoda
- Family: Volutidae
- Genus: Amoria
- Subgenus: Amoria
- Species: A. molleri

Binomial name
- Amoria molleri (Iredale, 1936)

Synonyms
- Amoria (Amoria) molleri (Iredale, 1936); Relegamoria molleri Iredale, 1936 (original combination)

= Amoria molleri =

Species of gastropod

Amoria molleri is a species of sea snail, a marine gastropod mollusk in the family Volutidae, the volutes.

== Subspecies ==
- Amoria molleri isabelae Bail & Limpus, 2001
- Amoria molleri molleri (Iredale, 1936)
- Amoria molleri reducta Bail & Limpus, 2001
- Amoria molleri vandenbergae Bail & Limpus, 2001

== Description ==
The length of the shell varies between 45 mm and 110 mm.

== Distribution ==
This marine species occurs from Northeast Australia to New South Wales, Australia.
