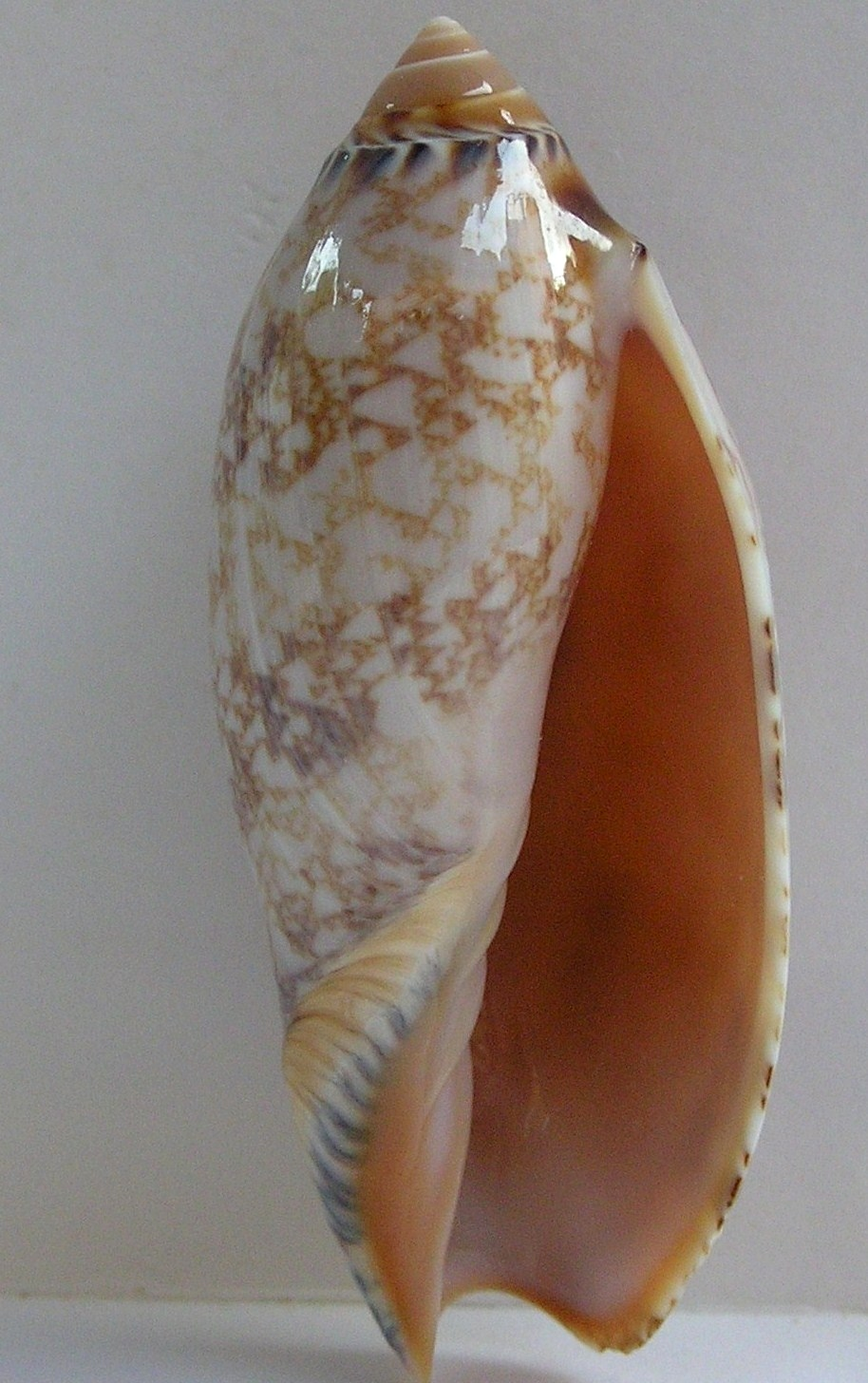
- Apertural view of a shell of Amoria damonii

Scientific classification
- Kingdom: Animalia
- Phylum: Mollusca
- Class: Gastropoda
- Subclass: Caenogastropoda
- Order: Neogastropoda
- Family: Volutidae
- Genus: Amoria
- Subgenus: Amoria
- Species: A. damonii

Binomial name
- Amoria damonii Gray, 1864

Synonyms
- Amoria (Amoria) keatsiana Ludbrook, 1953; Scaphella hedleyi Iredale, 1914; Voluta gatliffi Sowerby III, 1910; Voluta reticulata Reeve, 1844

= Amoria damonii =

Species of gastropod

Amoria damonii, common name Damon's volute, is a species of sea snail, a marine gastropod mollusk in the family Volutidae, the volutes.

It forms a complex of attractive, large shells which has been studied extensively by Abbottsmith.

It was named in honor of English conchologist Robert Damon (1814–1889).

== Taxonomy ==
According to Bail et al. (2001) the following taxa can be differentiated:

Amoria (Amoria) damonii damonii Gray 1864
= reticulata (Reeve, 1844)
= hedleyi (Iredale, 1914)
Amoria (Amoria) damonii forma keatsiana Ludbrook, 1953
= gatliffi (Sowerby III, 1910)
Amoria (Amoria) damonii reevei (Sowerby II, 1864)
Amoria (Amoria) damonii ludbrookae Bail & Limpus, 1997

== Description ==
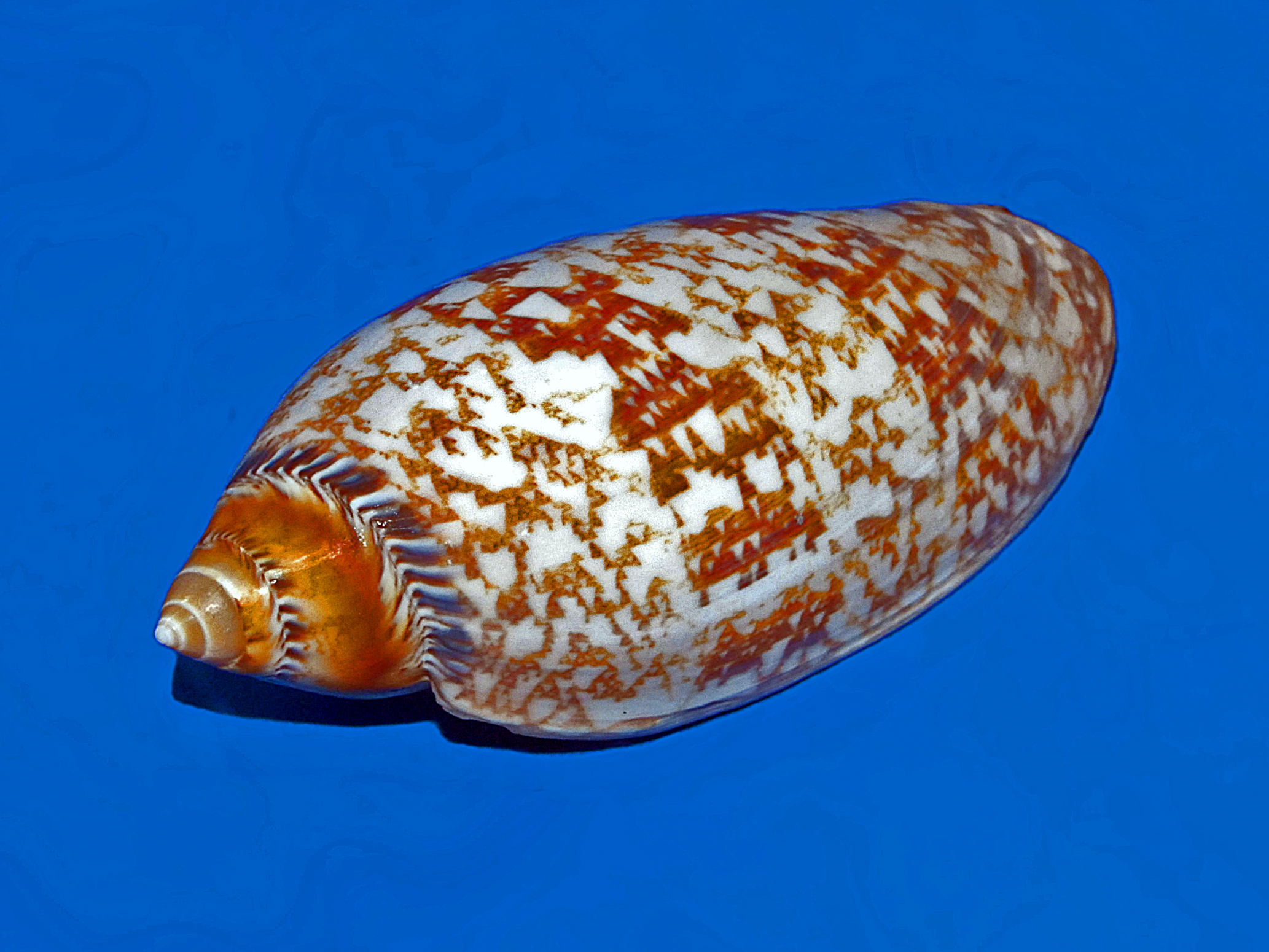
A shell of Amoria damonii

Amoria damonii has a large size that varies between 75 and 140 mm.

The shell surface exhibits a network of closely spaced, angular intersecting lines, resulting in a pattern of crowded triangular spots. The sutural callosity is very dark. The protoconch is glossy, domed, white on the early whorls, tawny later. The spire is conical with a deep-set suture.

== Distribution ==
The Amoria damonii complex includes four large, evidently correlated populations of Amoria, whose distribution extends from Cape Leeuwin (S.W. Australia) to the northern east coast of Queensland, i.e. for more than 6,500 km of coastline. Such a large range, rare in Volutidae, is even more unusual for an Amoria. This long stretch of coastline implies genetic differentiation and favours polytypism, giving rise to many taxonomic problems.

== Habitat ==
These marine gastropod molluscs occur in tropical zones on continental shelf, intertidal and subtidal waters, at depths of 0 to 90 m.

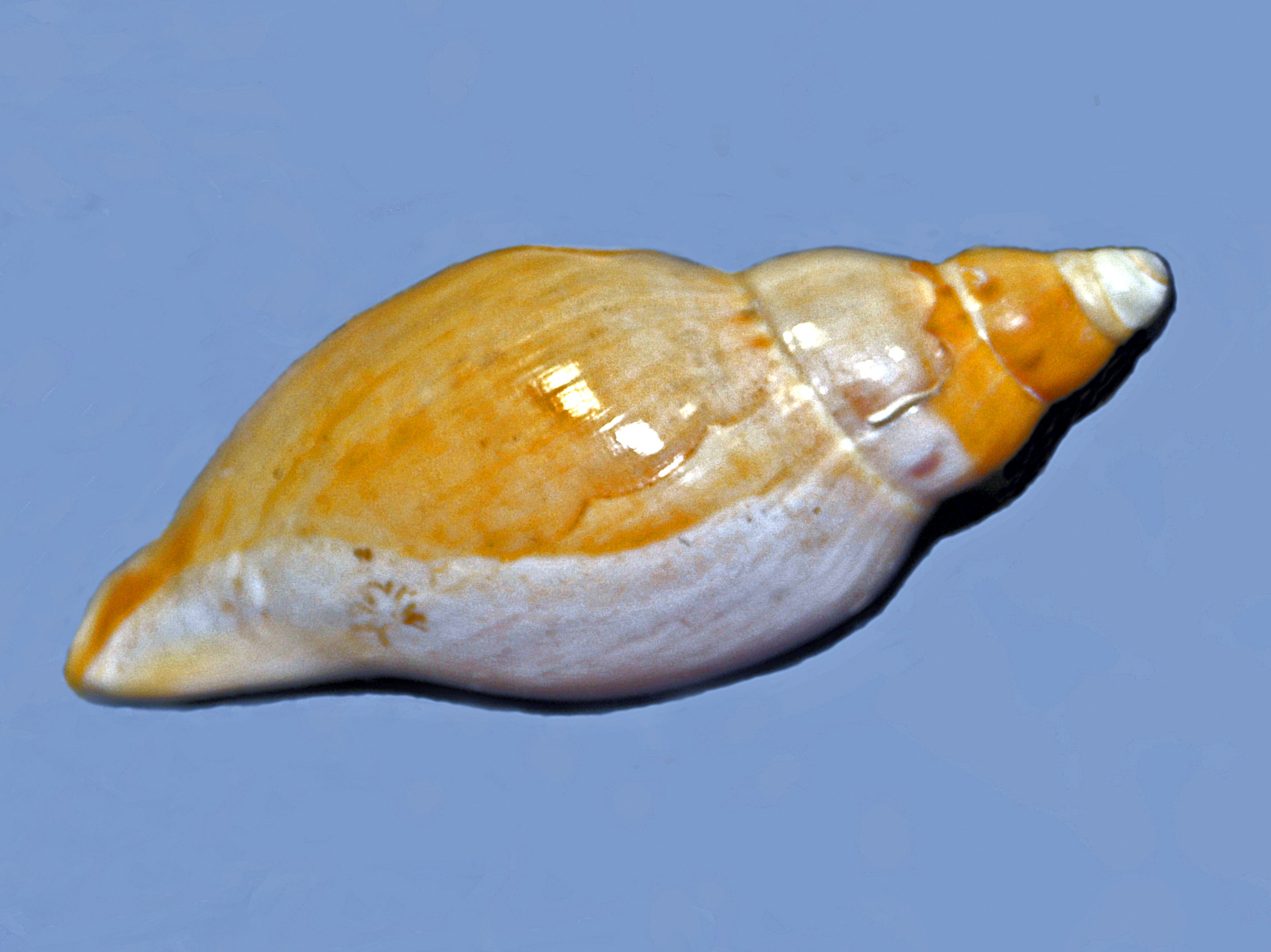
A shell of Amoria (Amoria) damonii reevei

== Bibliography ==
- A. G. Hinton – Guide to Australian Shells
- Alan G. Hinton – Shells of New Guinea & Central Pacific
- Bail P. & Poppe G. T. 2001. A conchological iconography: a taxonomic introduction of the recent Volutidae. ConchBooks, Hackenheim.
- Bail, P., Limpus, A. & Poppe, G. T. (2001): "The Genus Amoria". In: Poppe, G. T. & Groh, K.: A Conchological Iconography. 50 pp., 93 plts. ConchBooks, Hackenheim, ISBN 3-925919-46-5.
- Harald Douté, M. A. Fontana Angioy – Volutes, The Doute collection
- Wilson, B. (1993). Australian Marine Shells Part 2
- Wilson, B.R. & Gillett, K. 1971. Australian shells: illustrating and describing 600 species of marine gastropods found in Australian waters. Sydney : Reed Books 168 pp.
- Weaver, C.S. & du Pont, J.E. 1967. A review of Amoria damoni Gray, 1864 and two species proposed for the homonyms Voluta bullata Swainson, 1828 and Voluta lineata Leach, 1814. Veliger 9(4): 382–387, pls 52, 53
- Weaver, C.S. & du Pont, J.E. 1970. Living Volutes - A Monograph of the Recent Volutidae of the World. Monograph Series No. 1. Greenville Delaware : Delaware Museum of Natural History pp. 1–375.
- Wells, F.E. & Bryce, C.W. 1986. Seashells of Western Australia. Perth : Western Australian Museum 207 pp.
