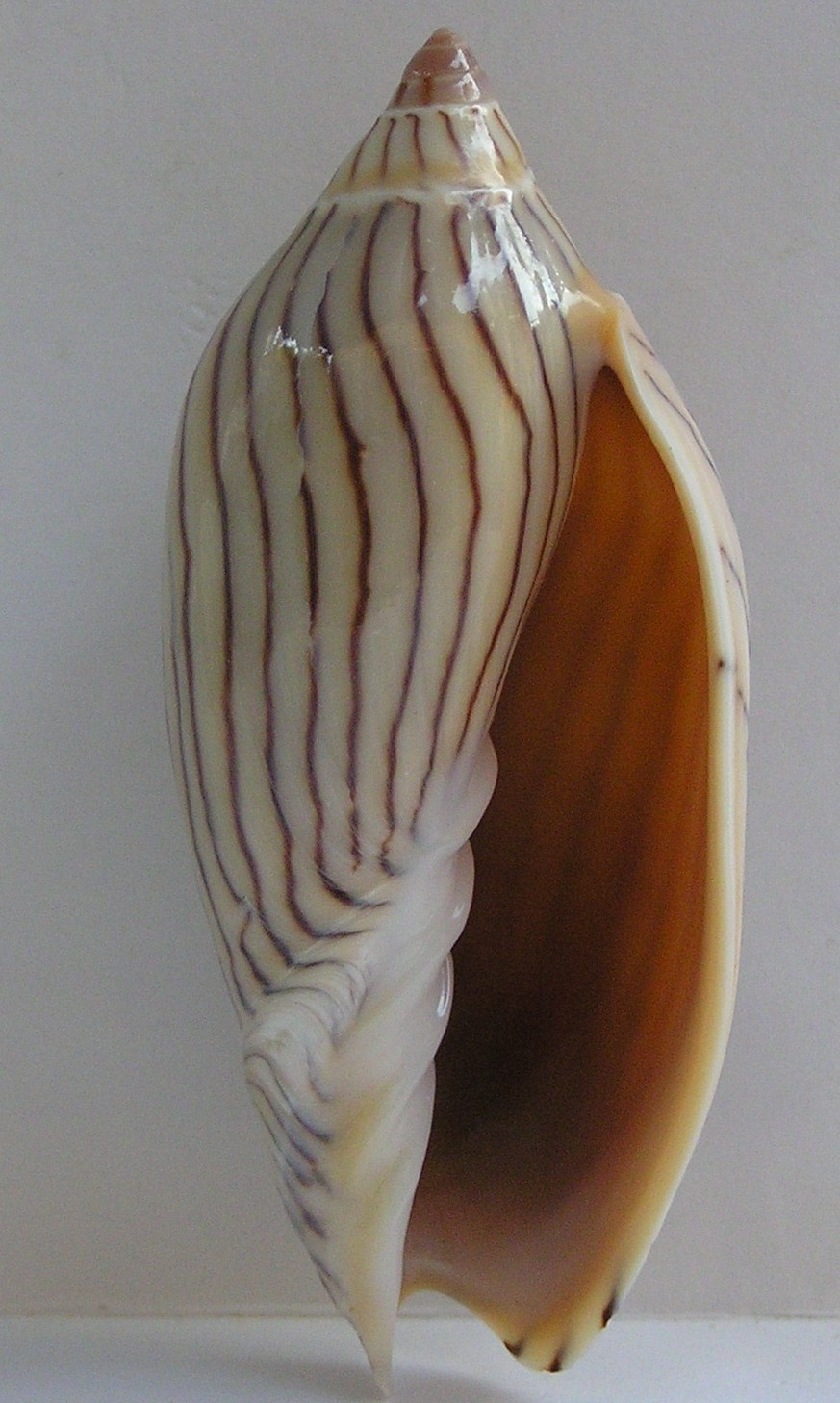
- Apertural view of a shell of Amoria ellioti

Scientific classification
- Kingdom: Animalia
- Phylum: Mollusca
- Class: Gastropoda
- Subclass: Caenogastropoda
- Order: Neogastropoda
- Family: Volutidae
- Genus: Amoria
- Species: A. ellioti

Binomial name
- Amoria ellioti (G.B. Sowerby II, 1864)

Synonyms
- Amoria (Amoria) ellioti (G.B. Sowerby II, 1864); Voluta ellioti G.B. Sowerby II, 1864 (original combination)

= Amoria ellioti =

Species of gastropod

Amoria ellioti, common name the Elliot's volute, is a species of sea snail, a marine gastropod mollusk in the family Volutidae, the volutes.

== Description ==
The length of the shell varies between 50 mm and 110 mm.

(Original description in Latin) The solid shell is spindle-shaped with slightly angular edges. The spire has a pale yellowish color, adorned with wavy longitudinal stripes or bands of red. The spire is short and ends in an irregularly papillose apex. The whorls are slightly inflated, and the sutures between them are white and raised.

The aperture of the shell is subangulosa at the back and narrow in the front. The outer lip is slightly thickened but not expanded. The columella (the inner lip of the aperture) is thickened at the front and has four oblique folds.

== Distribution ==
This marine species is endemic to Australia and occurs off Western Australia.
