= Amoria simoneae =

Scientific classification
- Kingdom: Animalia
- Phylum: Mollusca
- Class: Gastropoda
- Subclass: Caenogastropoda
- Order: Neogastropoda
- Family: Volutidae
- Genus: Amoria
- Subgenus: Amoria
- Species: A. simoneae

Binomial name
- Amoria simoneae Bail & Limpus, 2003

Synonyms
- Amoria (Amoria) simoneae Bail & Limpus, 2003

Species of gastropod

Amoria simoneae is a species of sea snail, a marine gastropod mollusk in the family Volutidae, the volutes.

== Distribution ==
This marine species is endemic to Australia and occurs off Western Australia.
