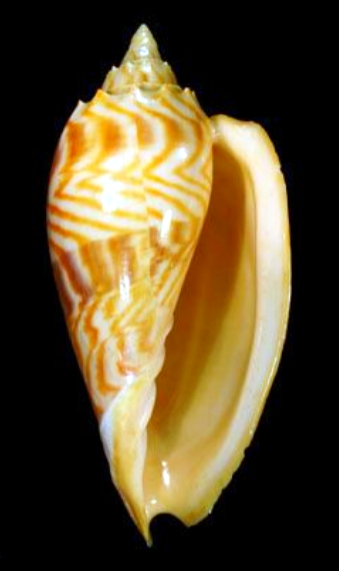
- Shell of Amoria jansae (specimen at the Natural History Museum Rotterdam)

Scientific classification
- Kingdom: Animalia
- Phylum: Mollusca
- Class: Gastropoda
- Subclass: Caenogastropoda
- Order: Neogastropoda
- Family: Volutidae
- Genus: Amoria
- Species: A. jansae

Binomial name
- Amoria jansae van Pel & Moolenbeek, 2010

Synonyms
- Amoria (Cymbiolista) jansae van Pel & Moolenbeek, 2010 alternative representation

= Amoria jansae =

Species of gastropod

Amoria jansae is a species of sea snail, a marine gastropod mollusk in the family Volutidae, the volutes.

Subspecies

- Amoria jansae jansae van Pel & Moolenbeek, 2010
- Amoria jansae pithensis Bail & Limpus, 2011

== Description ==
The length of the shell attains 127 mm.

== Distribution ==
This marine species is endemic to Australia and occurs off New South Wales and Queensland.
