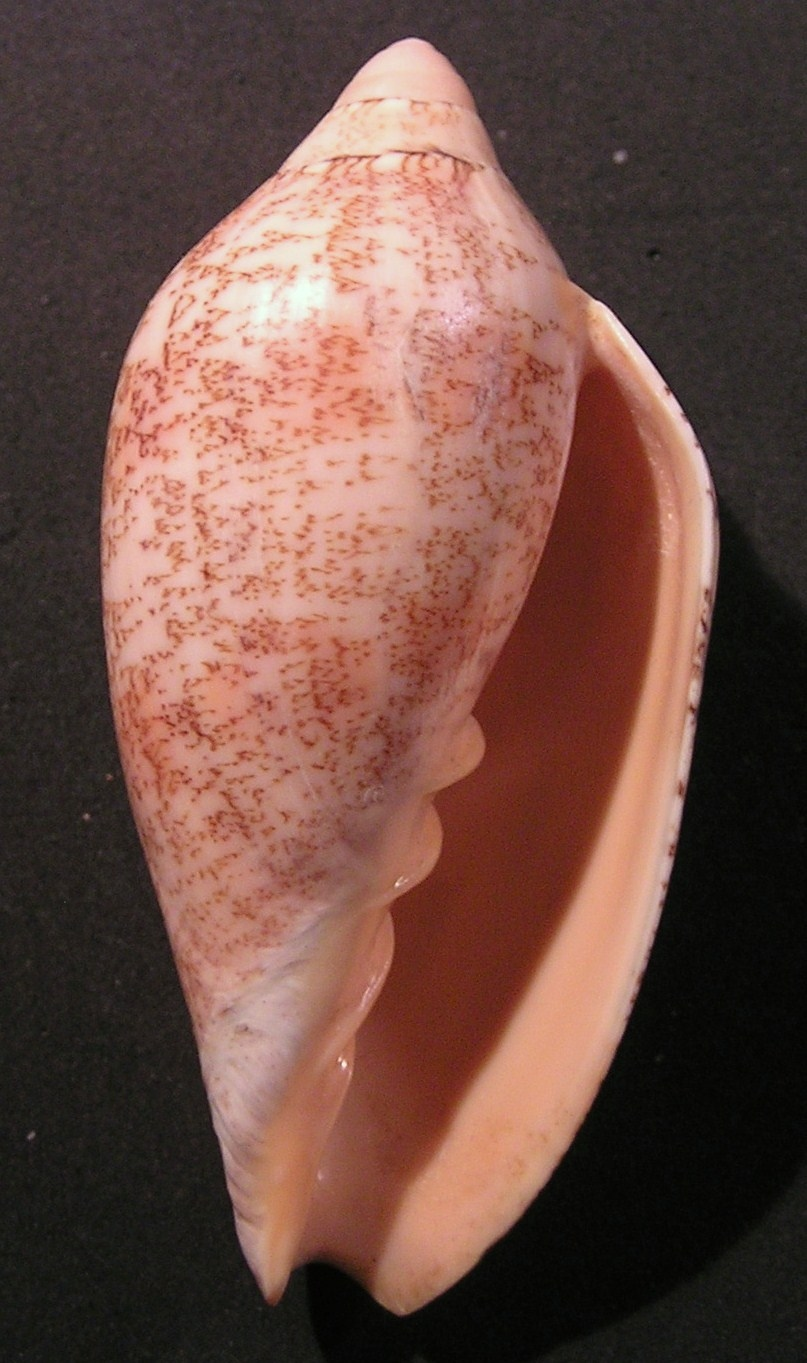
- Apertural view of a shell of Amoria exoptanda

Scientific classification
- Kingdom: Animalia
- Phylum: Mollusca
- Class: Gastropoda
- Subclass: Caenogastropoda
- Order: Neogastropoda
- Family: Volutidae
- Genus: Amoria
- Species: A. exoptanda

Binomial name
- Amoria exoptanda (Reeve, 1849)

Synonyms
- Amoria (Amoria) exoptanda (Reeve, 1849); Voluta exoptanda Reeve, 1849 (original combination)

= Amoria exoptanda =

Species of gastropod

Amoria exoptanda, common name the desirable volute, is a species of sea snail, a marine gastropod mollusk in the family Volutidae, the volutes.

== Description ==
The length of the shell varies between 85 mm and 110 mm.

(Original description) The shell is cylindrically oblong, somewhat olive-shaped, with a short, conical spire that terminates in an obtusely papillary apex. The whorls are smooth, initially sloping around the upper part, then becoming more swollen before gradually tapering. The columella is strongly four-plaited. The aperture is relatively narrow, and the outer lip is only slightly thickened.

The shell exhibits a pale rose-orange coloration, adorned with two faint bands. Densely distributed throughout the shell are sharply waved, fine chestnut-red lines. The columella and the interior of the aperture are a rich orange-carnelian color.

== Distribution ==
This marine species is endemic to Australia and occurs off South Australia and Western Australia.
