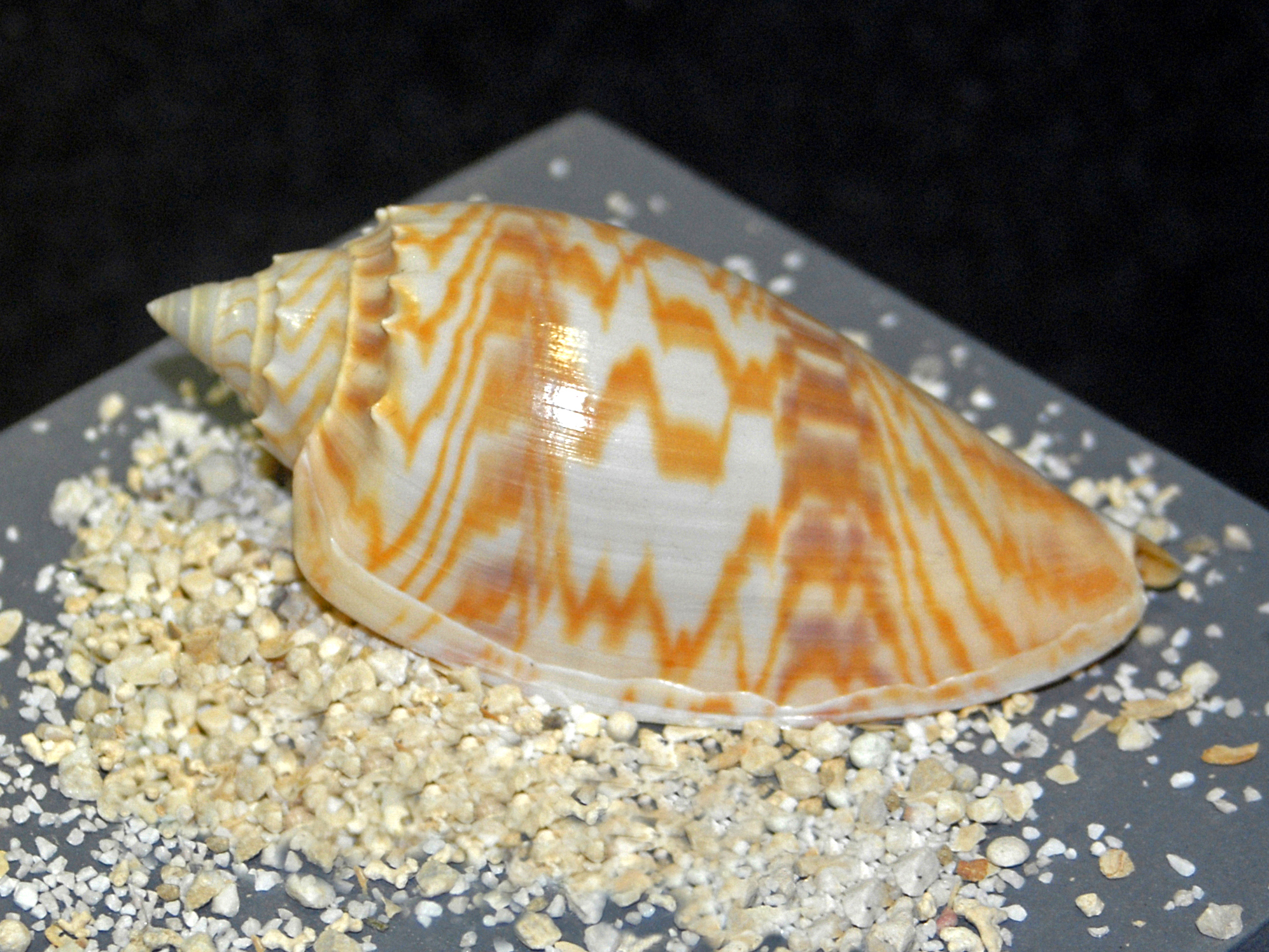
- A shell of Amoria hunteri

Scientific classification
- Kingdom: Animalia
- Phylum: Mollusca
- Class: Gastropoda
- Subclass: Caenogastropoda
- Order: Neogastropoda
- Family: Volutidae
- Genus: Amoria
- Subgenus: Cymbiolista
- Species: A. hunteri

Binomial name
- Amoria hunteri (Iredale, 1931)

Synonyms
- Amoria (Cymbiolista) hunteri (Iredale, 1931); Cymbiolista hunteri Iredale, 1931 (basionym); Voluta marmorata Swainson, 1821 (Invalid: junior homonym of Voluta marmorata Shaw & Nodder, 1808)

= Amoria hunteri =

Species of gastropod

Amoria hunteri, common name Hunter's marbled volute, is a species of sea snail, a marine gastropod mollusk in the family Volutidae, the volutes.

== Description ==
Amoria hunteri is the species with the largest shell in the genus Amoria. The length varies between 90 mm and 190 mm. It is solid and fusiform. The colour pattern is quite variable, the base colour may be white, yellowish or pink. It has a very glossy marbled surface, with reddish or brown zig-zag bands, a small, smooth and pointed conical protoconch and an elongate aperture.

== Distribution ==
This marine species is endemic to Australia and occurs in deep waters off New South Wales and Queensland.
