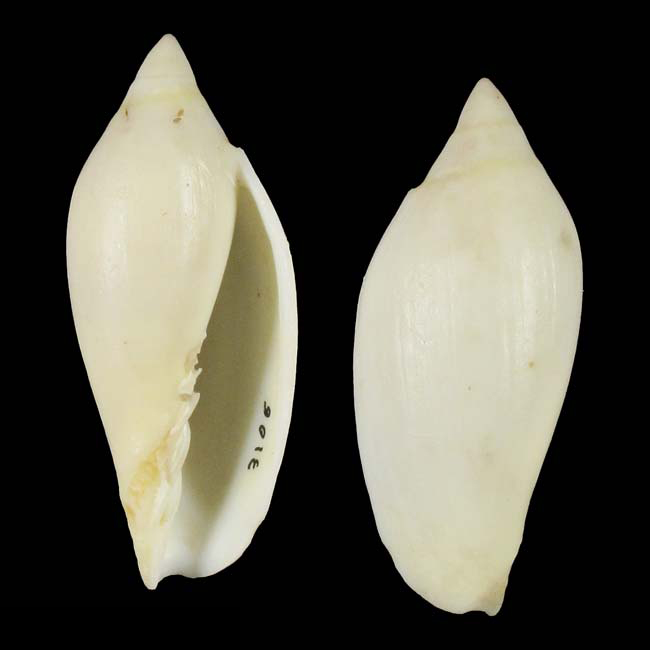

Scientific classification
- Kingdom: Animalia
- Phylum: Mollusca
- Class: Gastropoda
- Subclass: Caenogastropoda
- Order: Neogastropoda
- Family: Volutidae
- Genus: Amoria
- Subgenus: Amoria
- Species: A. rinkensi

Binomial name
- Amoria rinkensi Poppe, 1986

Synonyms
- Amoria (Amoria) rinkensi Poppe, 1986

= Amoria rinkensi =

Species of gastropod

Amoria rinkensi is a species of sea snail, a marine gastropod mollusk in the family Volutidae, the volutes.

== Description ==
The length of the shell varies between 50 mm and 95 mm.

== Distribution ==
This marine species occurs off Northwest Australia.
