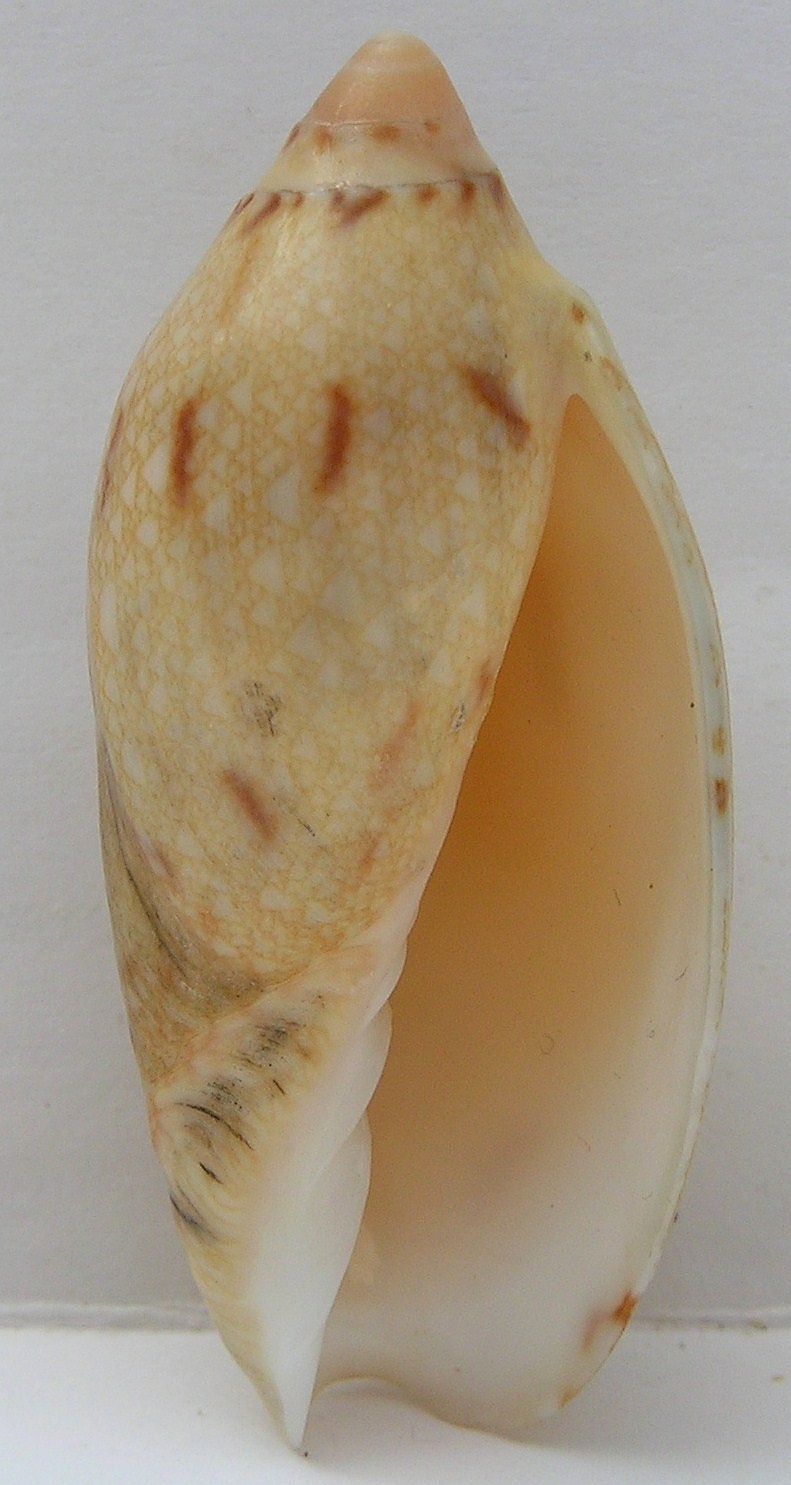
- Apertural view of a shell of Amoria praetexta

Scientific classification
- Kingdom: Animalia
- Phylum: Mollusca
- Class: Gastropoda
- Subclass: Caenogastropoda
- Order: Neogastropoda
- Family: Volutidae
- Genus: Amoria
- Species: A. praetexta

Binomial name
- Amoria praetexta (Reeve, 1849)

Synonyms
- Amoria (Amoria) praetexta (Reeve, 1849); Amoria turneri cumingi Gray, 1864; Voluta praetexta Reeve, 1849 (original combination)

= Amoria praetexta =

Species of gastropod

Amoria praetexta, common name the pretext volute, is a species of sea snail, a marine gastropod mollusk in the family Volutidae, the volutes.

== Description ==
The length of the shell varies between 34 mm and 75 mm.

(Original description) The shell is somewhat elongate-ovate, truncated at the base. The spire is relatively short, with a papillary and slightly acuminate apex. The whorls are initially slanted, then become flatly convex. The columella exhibits three distinct plaits. The aperture is slightly effused, and the outer lip is scarcely thickened.

The shell is whitish in color, adorned with a fine, neat reticulation across its entire surface. The sutural edge of each whorl is spotted with very dark chestnut, and two bands of distant, flexuous, linear spots encircle the shell. The interior of the aperture is tinged with chestnut.

== Distribution ==
This marine species is endemic to Australia and occurs off Northern Territory and Western Australia.
