= Morula whiteheadae =

Scientific classification
- Kingdom: Animalia
- Phylum: Mollusca
- Class: Gastropoda
- Subclass: Caenogastropoda
- Order: Neogastropoda
- Family: Muricidae
- Genus: Morula
- Species: M. whiteheadae

Binomial name
- Morula whiteheadae Houart, 2004

Synonyms
- Morula (Habromorula) whiteheadae Houart, 2004

Species of gastropod

Morula whiteheadae is a species of sea snail, a marine gastropod mollusk in the family Muricidae, the murex snails or rock snails. The species was named in honour of Thora Whitehead.
