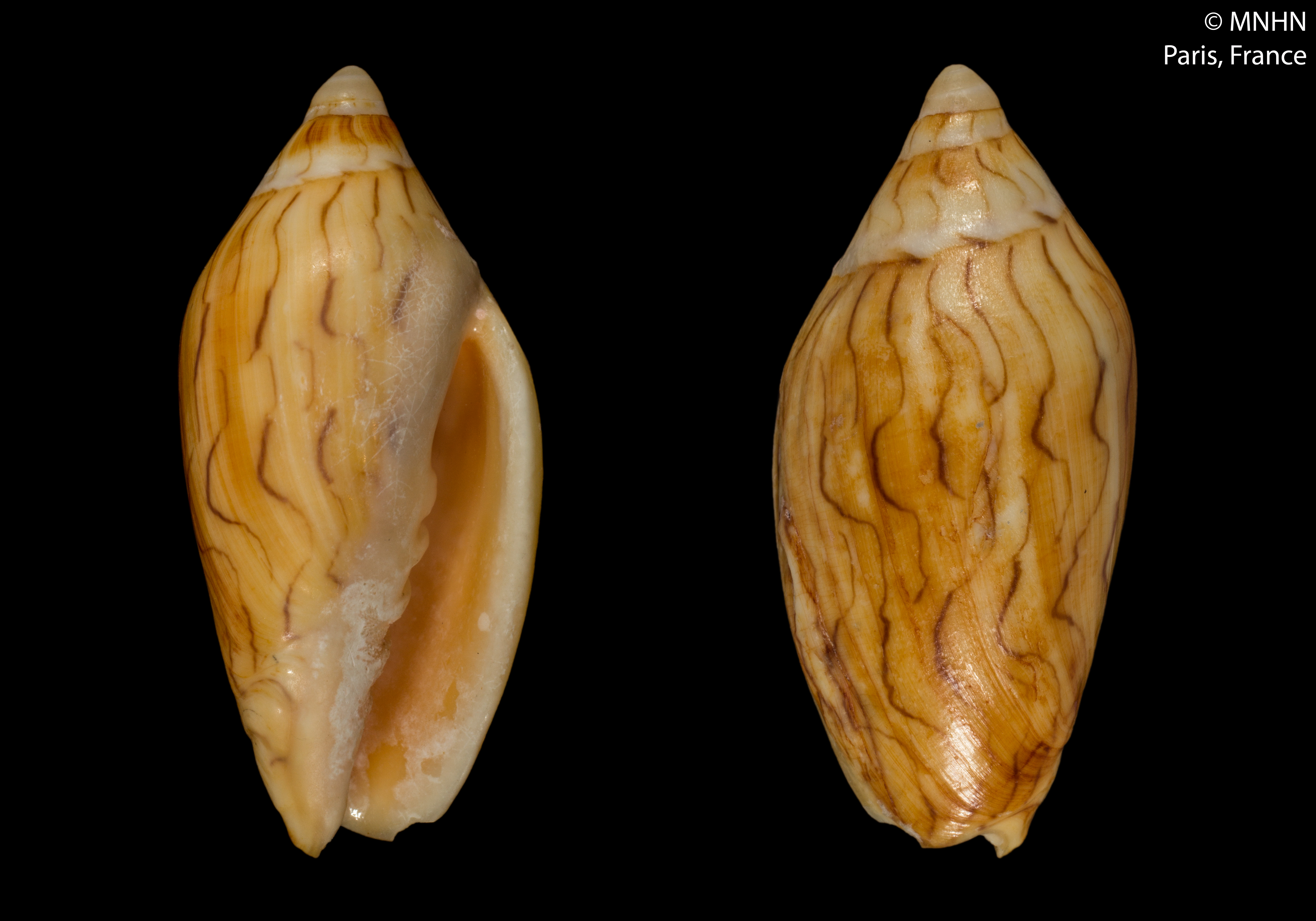
- Shell of Amoria peterstimpsoni (specimen at MNHN, Paris)

Scientific classification
- Kingdom: Animalia
- Phylum: Mollusca
- Class: Gastropoda
- Subclass: Caenogastropoda
- Order: Neogastropoda
- Family: Volutidae
- Genus: Amoria
- Species: A. peterstimpsoni

Binomial name
- Amoria peterstimpsoni T. Cossignani & Allary, 2019

= Amoria peterstimpsoni =

Species of gastropod

Amoria peterstimpsoni is a species of sea snail, a marine gastropod mollusk in the family Volutidae, the volutes.

== Description ==
The shell grows to a length of 53 mm.

== Distribution ==
This marine species is endemic to Australia and occurs off Western Australia. Peterstimpsoni thrives in intertidal and shallow subtidal zones, this species is typically found inhabiting sandy or muddy bottoms in these coastal regions.
