= Robert Damon =

- Born: 1814; Melcombe Regis, Weymouth, Dorset, England
- Died: 4 May 1889 (aged 75); Weymouth, Dorset, England
- Occupations: Naturalist and geologist

Robert Damon FGS (1814 – 4 May 1889) was an English conchologist and geologist.

Damon was at first a hosier and glover but with his son Robert Ferris Damon (1845–1929) he established a dealership in natural history specimens in Weymouth. The company supplied museums throughout North and South America, Australia and Europe with much Dorset geological material from the late 1840s to 1914. In 1860 Damon wrote Geology of Weymouth and the Isles of Portland; with Notes on the Natural History of the Coast and Neighbourhood which includes a map of the district, geological sections, plates of fossils, and coast views, in 1884 a second edition with archaeological notes was published. He also wrote (and published himself in 1857) A catalogue of the shells of Great Britain and Ireland with their synonyms and authorities.

Damon died aged 75 at his museum in Weymouth from heart disease.

The species Amoria damonii Gray, and Paramelania damoni were named in his honor.
