= Amoria austellus =

Scientific classification
- Kingdom: Animalia
- Phylum: Mollusca
- Class: Gastropoda
- Subclass: Caenogastropoda
- Order: Neogastropoda
- Family: Volutidae
- Genus: Amoria
- Species: A. austellus

Binomial name
- Amoria austellus H. Morrison & B. Schneider, 2021

Synonyms
- Amoria (Amoria) austellus H. Morrison & B. Schneider, 2021 alternative representation

Species of gastropod

Amoria austellus is a species of sea snail, a marine gastropod mollusk in the family Volutidae, the volutes.

== Distribution ==
This marine species is endemic to Australia and occurs in Esperance Bay, Western Australia.
