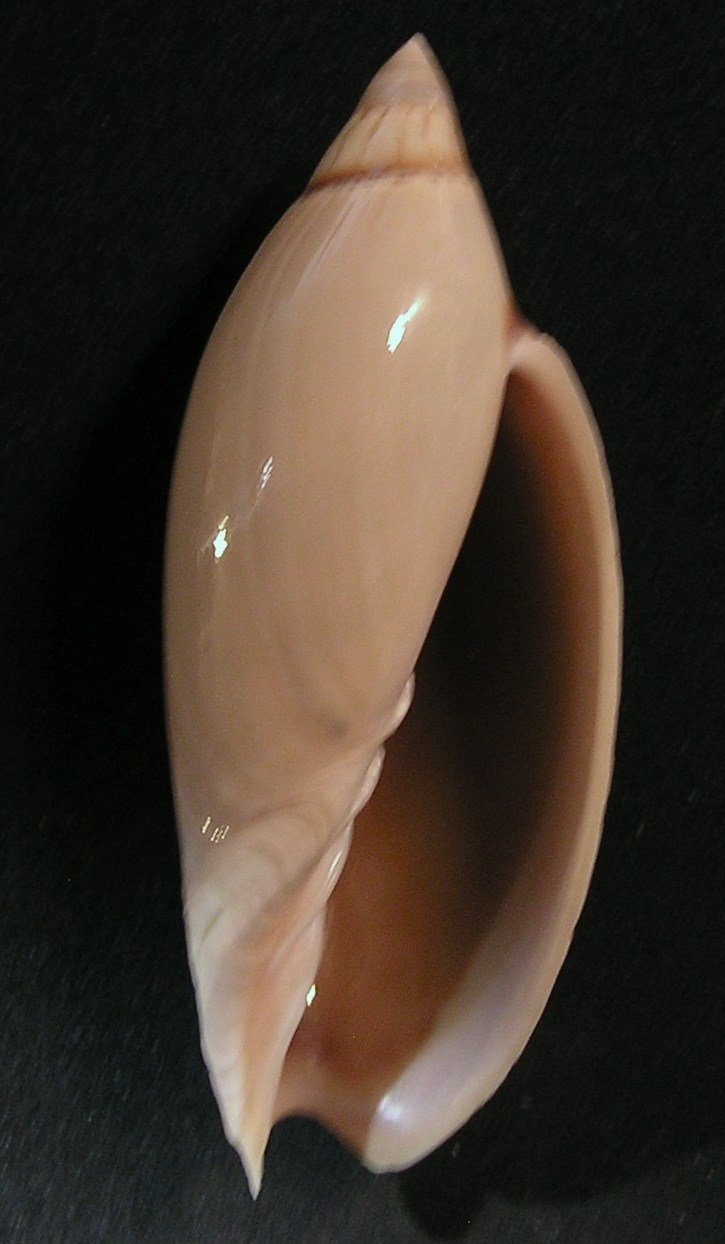
- Apertural view of a shell of Amoria grayi

Scientific classification
- Kingdom: Animalia
- Phylum: Mollusca
- Class: Gastropoda
- Subclass: Caenogastropoda
- Order: Neogastropoda
- Family: Volutidae
- Genus: Amoria
- Species: A. grayi

Binomial name
- Amoria grayi Ludbrook, 1953

Synonyms
- Amoria grayi Ludbrook, 1953; Amoria turneri Gray, 1855; Voluta pallida Griffith & Pidgeon, 1834

= Amoria grayi =

Species of gastropod

Amoria grayi, commonly named Gray's volute, is a species of sea snail, a marine gastropod mollusk in the family Volutidae, the volutes.

Amoria gray is a replacement name for Voluta pallida Gray, 1834, non Linnaeus, 1767

== Subspecies ==
- Amoria grayi grayi Ludbrook, 1953
- Amoria grayi kawamurai Habe, 1975
- Amoria grayi whitworthi Bail & Limpus, 2001

== Description ==
The shell of Amoria grayi is smooth, glossy, and typically wide with a pointed spire and a narrow gap, often displaying pale cream or pinkish tones with faint axial banding that distinguishes it from related volutes and the length of the shell varies between 45 and 130 mm (1.8 and 5.1 in).

== Distribution ==
This marine species occurs off Western Australia and the Northern Territory, Australia.
