= Amoria ryosukei =

Scientific classification
- Kingdom: Animalia
- Phylum: Mollusca
- Class: Gastropoda
- Subclass: Caenogastropoda
- Order: Neogastropoda
- Family: Volutidae
- Genus: Amoria
- Subgenus: Amoria
- Species: A. ryosukei

Binomial name
- Amoria ryosukei Habe, 1975

Synonyms
- Amoria (Amoria) ryosukei Habe, 1975

Species of gastropod

Amoria ryosukei is a species of sea snail, a marine gastropod mollusk in the family Volutidae, the volutes.

== Description ==
The shell grows to a length of 45 mm.

== Distribution ==
This marine species is endemic to Australia and occurs in the Arafura Sea off the Northern Territory.
