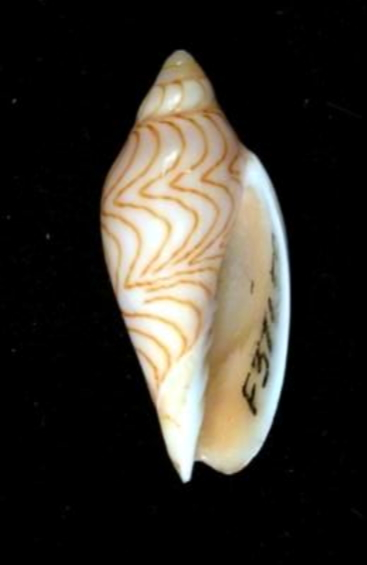
- Shell of Amoria necopinata (holotype at Museums Victoria)

Scientific classification
- Kingdom: Animalia
- Phylum: Mollusca
- Class: Gastropoda
- Subclass: Caenogastropoda
- Order: Neogastropoda
- Family: Volutidae
- Genus: Amoria
- Species: A. necopinata

Binomial name
- Amoria necopinata Darragh, 1983

Synonyms
- Amoria (Amoria) necopinata Darragh, 1983

= Amoria necopinata =

Species of gastropod

Amoria necopinata is a species of sea snail, a marine gastropod mollusk in the family Volutidae, the volutes.

== Description ==
The length of the shell attains 36 mm.

== Distribution ==
This marine species is endemic to Australia and occurs off Queensland.
