= Amoria stricklandi =

Scientific classification
- Kingdom: Animalia
- Phylum: Mollusca
- Class: Gastropoda
- Subclass: Caenogastropoda
- Order: Neogastropoda
- Family: Volutidae
- Genus: Amoria
- Species: A. stricklandi

Binomial name
- Amoria stricklandi Bail & Limpus, 2016

Synonyms
- Amoria (Amoria) stricklandi Bail & Limpus, 2016 alternative representation

Species of mollusc

Amoria stricklandi is a species of sea snail, a marine gastropod mollusk in the family Volutidae, the volutes.

== Distribution ==
This marine species is endemic to Australia and occurs off Western Australia
