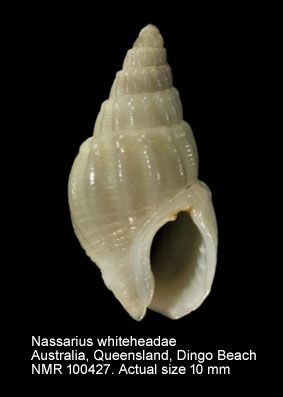
- Type specimen collected from Dingo Beach, Queensland

Scientific classification
- Kingdom: Animalia
- Phylum: Mollusca
- Class: Gastropoda
- Subclass: Caenogastropoda
- Order: Neogastropoda
- Superfamily: Buccinoidea
- Family: Nassariidae
- Subfamily: Nassariinae
- Genus: Nassarius
- Species: N. whiteheadae

Binomial name
- Nassarius whiteheadae Cernohorsky, 1984

Synonyms
- Nassarius (Zeuxis) whiteheadae Cernohorsky, 1984

= Nassarius whiteheadae =

Species of marine mollusc

Nassarius whiteheadae is a species of dog whelks, a marine mollusc, in the family Nassariidae. Named after Thora Whitehead, the species is endemic to Australia, known from intertidal waters of Northern Queensland.

== Description ==
Nassarius whiteheadae has a shell up to 13 mm (0.51 in) in length. The shells are elongate-ovate with occasionally produced spires, and a teleoconch of between 4–5.25 weakly convex whorls, and a protoconch with embryonic whorls numbering 2.25 to 2.5. It can be differentiated from N. fraudator due to being smaller, having more slender and offset spire whorls, and due to its unusual paucispiral protoconch.

== Taxonomy ==
The species was first described in 1984 by Walter Oliver Cernohorsky, who used the name Nassarius (Zeuxis) whiteheadae, placing the species in a subgenus named Zeuxis, which is no longer accepted. The holotype was collected from Sinclair Bay near Edgecumbe Bay in North Queensland, Australia, and is held by the Australian Museum. N. whiteheadae was named after Australian malacologist Thora Whitehead. Paratypes of the species are held at the Auckland War Memorial Museum.

== Distribution and habitat ==
The species is endemic to Australia, known to occur in North Queensland in intertidal waters.
