= Amoria weldensis =

Scientific classification
- Kingdom: Animalia
- Phylum: Mollusca
- Class: Gastropoda
- Subclass: Caenogastropoda
- Order: Neogastropoda
- Family: Volutidae
- Genus: Amoria
- Subgenus: Amoria
- Species: A. weldensis

Binomial name
- Amoria weldensis Bail & Limpus, 2001

Synonyms
- Amoria (Amoria) weldensis Bail & Limpus, 2001

Species of gastropod

Amoria weldensis is a species of sea snail, a marine gastropod mollusk in the family Volutidae, the volutes.

== Description ==
The length of the shell attains 75 mm.

== Distribution ==
This marine species is endemic to Australia and occurs off Western Australia.
