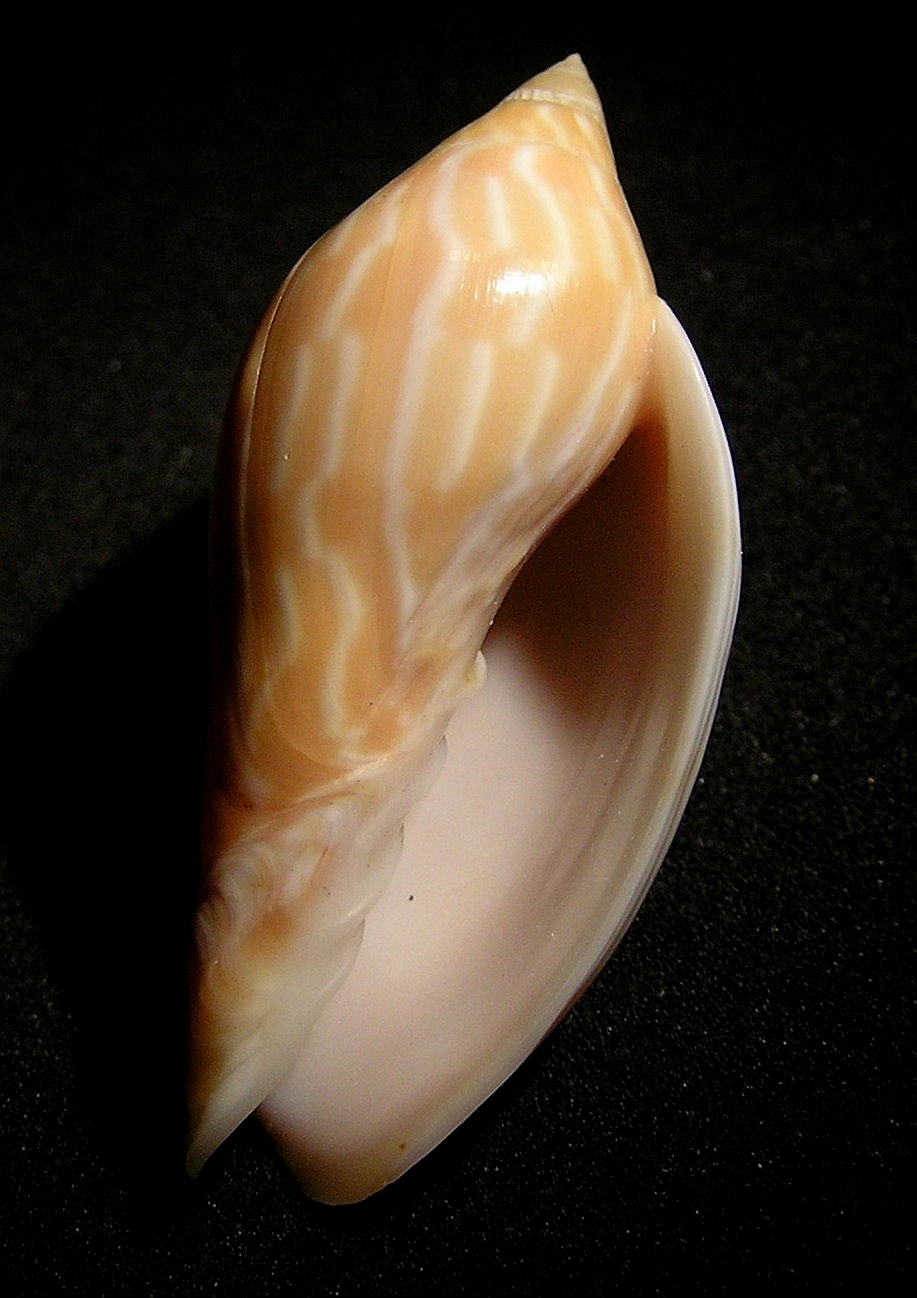
- Apertural view of a shell of Amoria guttata

Scientific classification
- Kingdom: Animalia
- Phylum: Mollusca
- Class: Gastropoda
- Subclass: Caenogastropoda
- Order: Neogastropoda
- Family: Volutidae
- Genus: Amoria
- Subgenus: Amoria
- Species: A. guttata

Binomial name
- Amoria guttata McMichael, 1964

Synonyms
- Amoria (Amoria) guttata McMichael, 1964

= Amoria guttata =

Species of gastropod

Amoria guttata is a species of sea snail, a marine gastropod mollusk in the family Volutidae, the volutes.

== Description ==
The length of the shell varies between 37 mm and 62 mm. Adult specimens are 45-60 mm in length.

== Distribution ==
This marine species occurs on the eastern Queensland coast of Australia.
