= Amoria marshallorum =

Scientific classification
- Kingdom: Animalia
- Phylum: Mollusca
- Class: Gastropoda
- Subclass: Caenogastropoda
- Order: Neogastropoda
- Family: Volutidae
- Genus: Amoria
- Species: A. marshallorum

Binomial name
- Amoria marshallorum H. Morrison & B. Schneider, 2021

Species of gastropod

Amoria marshallorum is a species of sea snail, a marine gastropod mollusk in the family Volutidae, the volutes.

== Distribution ==
This marine species is endemic to Australia and occurs in Cape Leeuwin, Western Australia.
