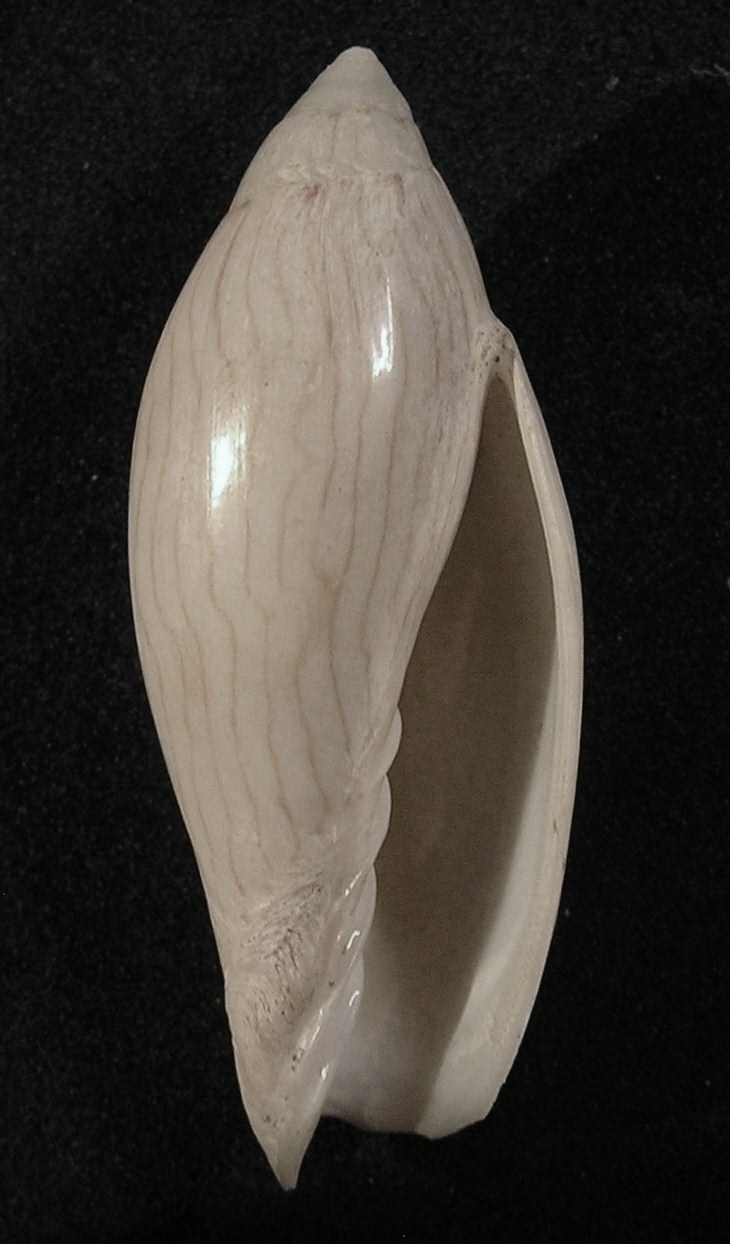
- Apertural view of a shell of Amoria turneri

Scientific classification
- Kingdom: Animalia
- Phylum: Mollusca
- Class: Gastropoda
- Subclass: Caenogastropoda
- Order: Neogastropoda
- Family: Volutidae
- Genus: Amoria
- Species: A. turneri

Binomial name
- Amoria turneri (Griffith & Pidgeon, 1834)

Synonyms
- Amoria (Amoria) turneri (Gray in Griffith & Pidgeon, 1834); Amoria (Amoria) turneri broderipi Gray, 1864; Amoria newmanae Cotton, 1949; Amoria turneri broderipi Gray, 1864; Voluta turneri Gray in Griffith & Pidgeon, 1834 (basionym)

= Amoria turneri =

Species of sea snail

Amoria turneri, common name Turner's volute, is a species of sea snail, a marine gastropod mollusk in the family Volutidae, the volutes.

The following subspecies have been brought into synonymy:

- Amoria turneri broderipi Gray, 1864 accepted as Amoria turneri (Gray in Griffith & Pidgeon, 1834)
- Amoria turneri cumingi Gray, 1864 accepted as Amoria praetexta (Reeve, 1849)
- Amoria turneri damonii Gray, 1864 accepted as Amoria damonii Gray, 1864
- Amoria turneri jamrachi Gray, 1864 accepted as Amoria jamrachi Gray, 1864

== Description ==
The length of the shell varies between 40 mm and 80 mm.

Amoria turneri possesses a solid, white shell adorned with regular, relatively broad brown lines. These lines are oriented obliquely to the shell's axis. Distinct sutural spots are also present. The spire is smooth, conical, and terminates in an acute apex.

== Distribution ==
This marine species is endemic to Australia and occurs off Northern Territory, Queensland, Western Australia; in the Arafura Sea and off New Guinea.
