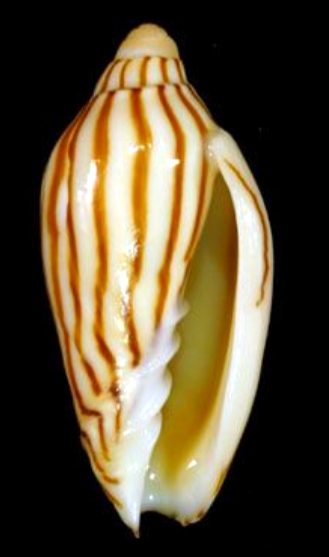
- Shell of Amoria dampieria (specimen at the Natural History Museum Rotterdam)

Scientific classification
- Kingdom: Animalia
- Phylum: Mollusca
- Class: Gastropoda
- Subclass: Caenogastropoda
- Order: Neogastropoda
- Family: Volutidae
- Genus: Amoria
- Species: A. dampieria

Binomial name
- Amoria dampieria Weaver, 1960

Synonymsref name="WoRMS" />
- Amoria (Amoria) dampieria Weaver, 1960; Zebramoria zebra dampieria Cotton, B.C. 1949 (nomen nudum)

= Amoria dampieria =

Species of gastropod

Amoria dampieria, common name the Dampier's volute, is a species of sea snail, a marine gastropod mollusk in the family Volutidae, the volutes.

== Description ==
The length of the shell varies between 25 mm and 33 mm.

== Distribution ==
This marine species is endemic to Australia and occurs off the Northern Territory and Western Australia.
