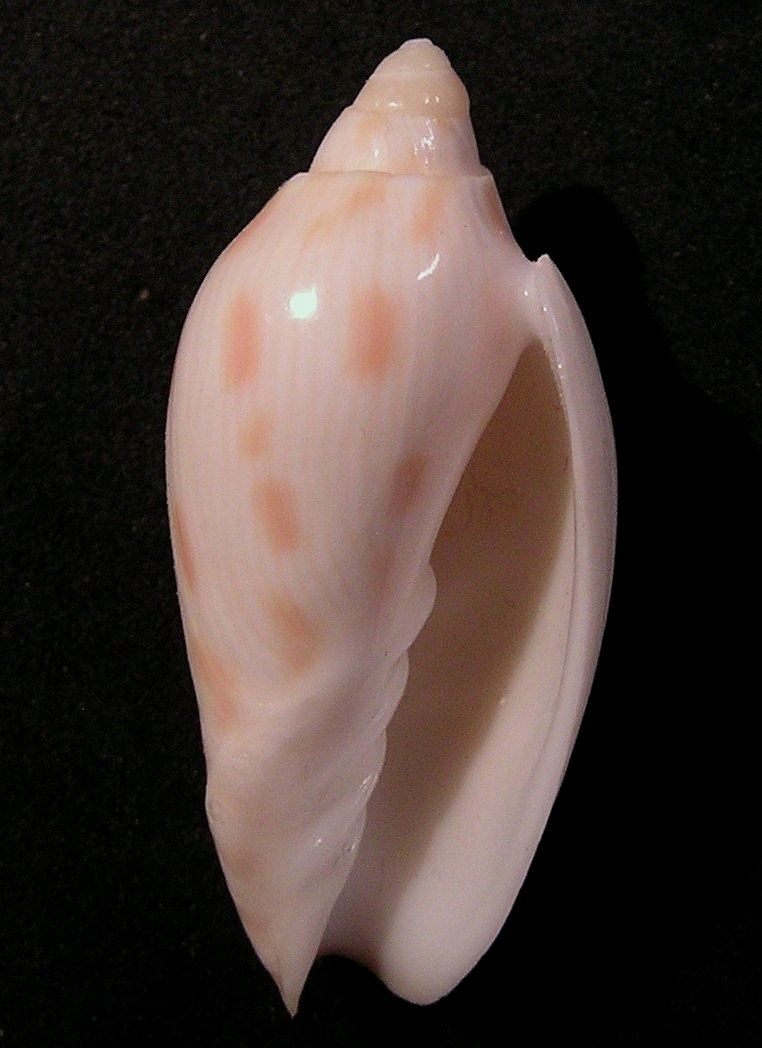
- Apertural view of a shell of Amoria canaliculata

Scientific classification
- Kingdom: Animalia
- Phylum: Mollusca
- Class: Gastropoda
- Subclass: Caenogastropoda
- Order: Neogastropoda
- Family: Volutidae
- Genus: Amoria
- Species: A. canaliculata

Binomial name
- Amoria canaliculata (McCoy, 1869)

Synonyms
- Amoria (Amoria) canaliculata (McCoy, 1869); Voluta (Amoria) canaliculata McCoy, 1869 (basionym); Voluta harfordi (Cox, 1869)

= Amoria canaliculata =

Species of gastropod

Amoria canaliculata, common name the caniculate volute, is a species of sea snail in the family Volutidae, the volutes.

== Description ==
The length of the shell varies between 30 mm and 70 mm.

(Original description) The shell is elongate-ovate with a short spire composed of 4–4.5 whorls, distinctly channeled at the suture. The columella bears four strong, subequal, oblique plaits, the most posterior of which extends into a ridge on the thickened anterior belt.

The shell is whitish and the body whorl displays five spiral rows of longitudinally elongate-oblong tawny spots, including one row at the suture.

== Distribution ==
This marine species occurs off Queensland, East Australia.
