= Amoria hansenae =

Scientific classification
- Kingdom: Animalia
- Phylum: Mollusca
- Class: Gastropoda
- Subclass: Caenogastropoda
- Order: Neogastropoda
- Family: Volutidae
- Genus: Amoria
- Species: A. hansenae

Binomial name
- Amoria hansenae H. Morrison, 2012

Species of gastropod

Amoria hansenae is a predatory species of sea snail, a marine gastropod mollusk belonging to the family Volutidae, the volutes.

== Description ==
The length of the shell varies between 35 mm and 50 mm.

== Distribution ==
This marine species is endemic to Australia and occurs off Western Australia.
