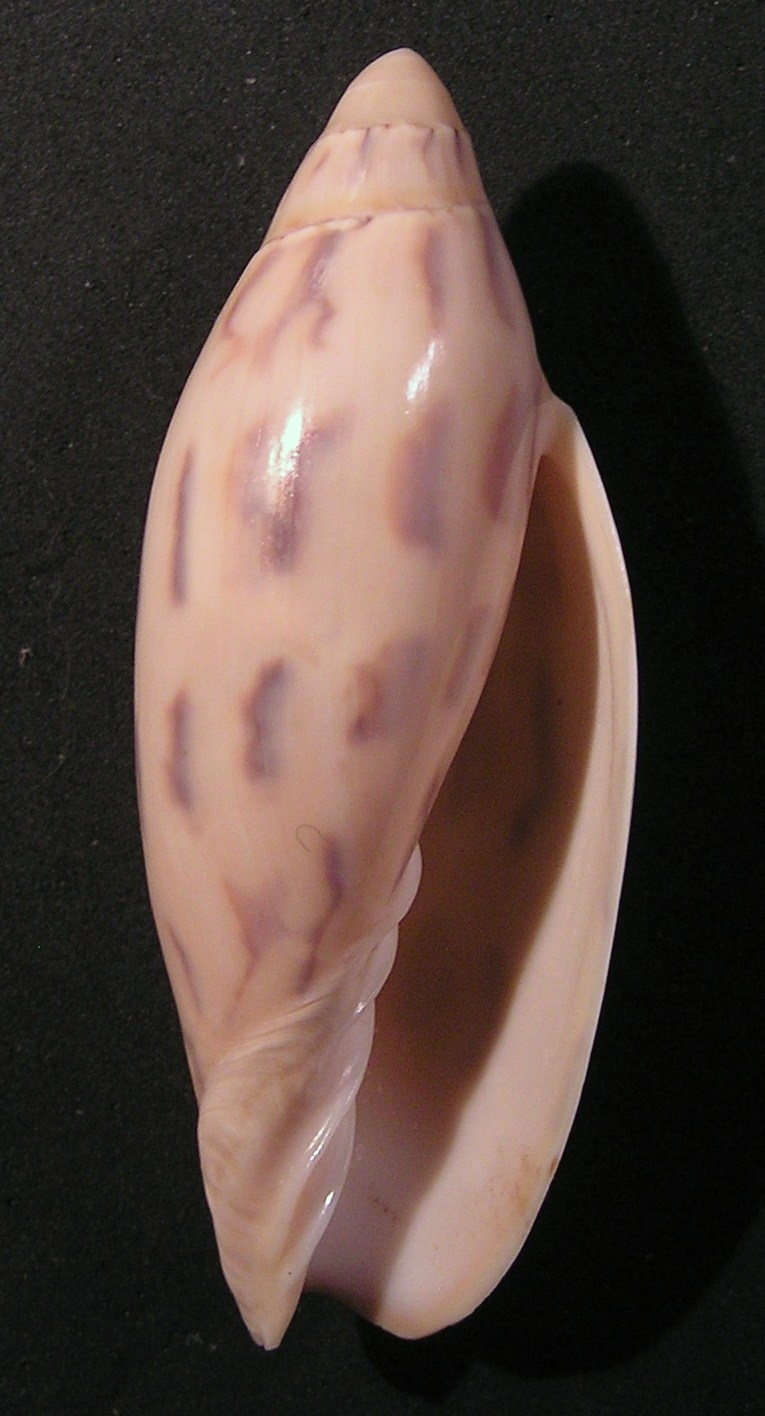
- Gastropodal view of a shell of Amoria maculata

Scientific classification
- Kingdom: Animalia
- Phylum: Mollusca
- Class: Gastropoda
- Subclass: Caenogastropoda
- Order: Neogastropoda
- Family: Volutidae
- Genus: Amoria
- Subgenus: Amoria
- Species: A. maculata

Binomial name
- Amoria maculata (Swainson, 1822)

Synonyms
- Amoria (Amoria) maculata (Swainson, 1822); Scaphella caroli Iredale, 1924 (unnecessary replacement name for Voluta maculata Swainson, 1822); Voluta maculata Swainson, 1822 (original combination); Voluta volva Gmelin, 1791 (nomen dubium)

= Amoria maculata =

Species of gastropod

Amoria maculata, common name Carol's volute, is a species of sea snail, a marine gastropod mollusk in the family Volutidae, the volutes.

== Description ==
The shell is smooth and glossy, with a whorled, straight sided spire. The body whorl is smoothly rounded, with no shoulder. The columella has four thin, strong plaits, and the outer lip is smooth and not thickened. Typically, the shell ranges in colour between white, cream, fawn and salmon, occasionally without a pattern, but typically featuring four spiral bands of brown patches. Shell length varies, but is usually 60-80mm.

The shell is brown, adorned with two spiral series of squarish dark spots, and an additional series of irregular spots situated near the suture.

== Distribution ==
This marine species is endemic to Australia and occurs from Queensland to New South Wales
