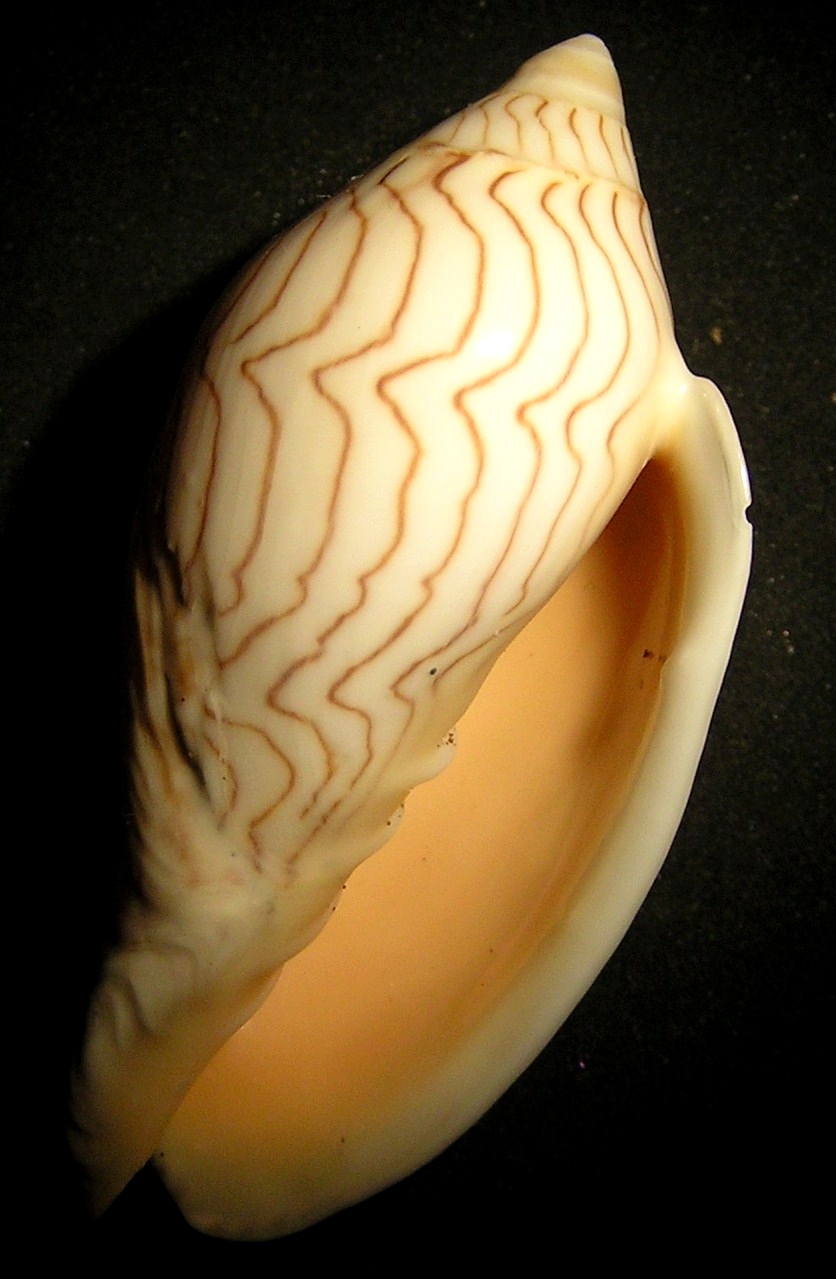
- Apertural view of a shell of Amoria undulata angasii

Scientific classification
- Kingdom: Animalia
- Phylum: Mollusca
- Class: Gastropoda
- Subclass: Caenogastropoda
- Order: Neogastropoda
- Family: Volutidae
- Genus: Amoria
- Species: A. undulata

Binomial name
- Amoria undulata (Lamarck, 1804)

Synonyms
- see list

= Amoria undulata =

Species of gastropod

Amoria undulata, common name wavy volute, is a species of sea snail, a marine gastropod mollusk in the family Volutidae, the volutes.

== Synonyms ==
- Amoria (Amoria) undulata (Lamarck, 1804)
- Amoria kingi Cox, 1871
- Scaphella moslemica Hedley, 1912
- Voluta angasii Sowerby II, 1864
- Voluta australiae (Cox, 1872)
- Voluta kingi J. C. Cox, 1871 junior subjective synonym
- Voluta sclateri Cox, 1869
- Voluta undulata Lamarck, 1804 (basionym)

== Distribution ==
This marine species is endemic to Australia and occurs off New South Wales, Queensland, South Australia, Tasmania, Victoria, Western Australia.

== Description ==
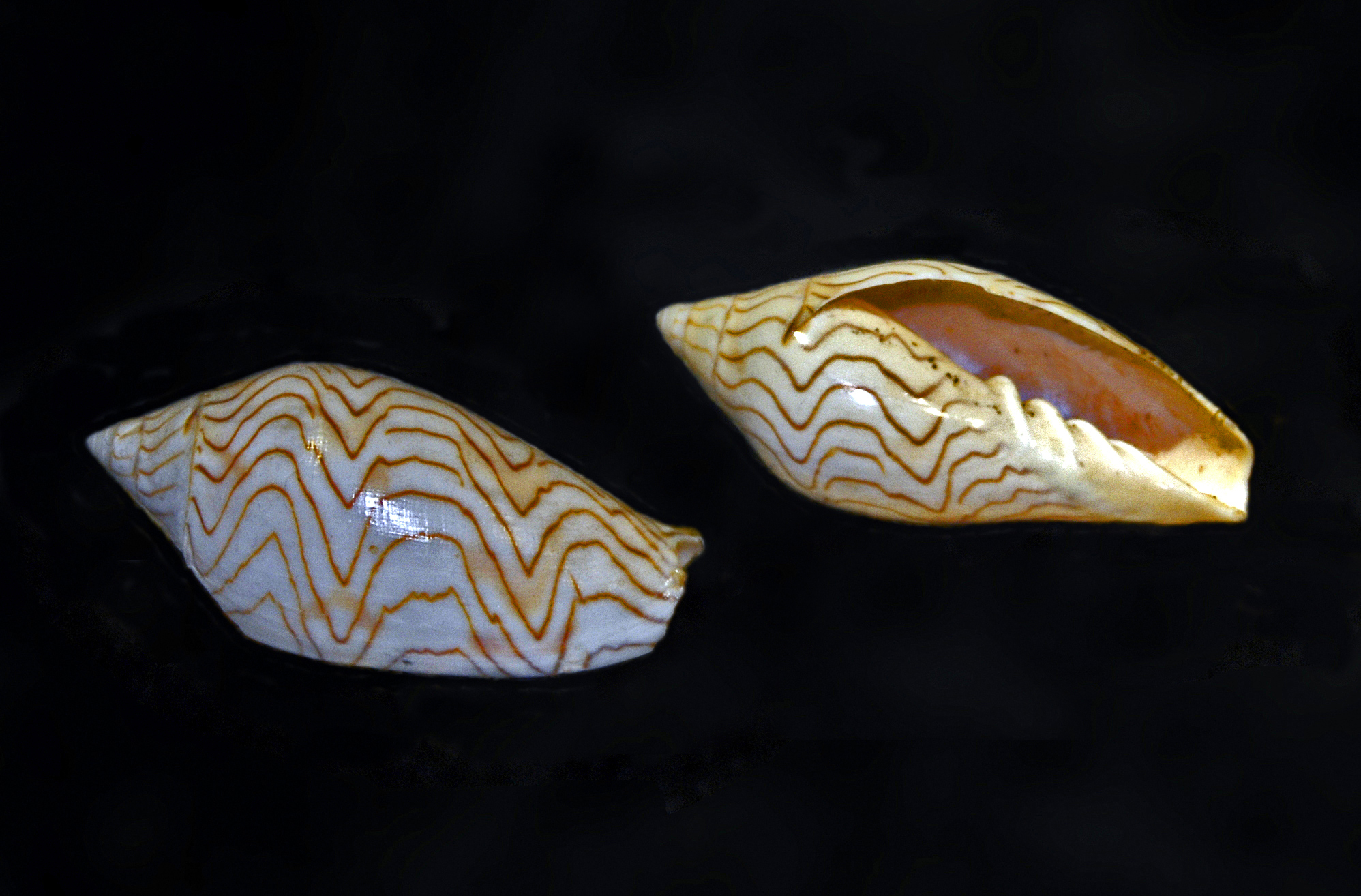
Shells of Amoria undulata

The shell exhibits an elongated, fusiform shape and reaches lengths between 60 and 120 mm. It is characterized by a smooth, solid, and roundly shouldered profile, culminating in a long, pointed, conical spire. The suture displays a calloused edge. The aperture is elongated and displays a salmon to orange coloration. The outer lip is smooth and thickened in adult specimens. The base color of the external shell surface is fawn or white-cream, adorned with thin, axial, wavy brown lines. The foot exhibits similar coloration with zigzag lines and stripes.

== Habitat ==
These sea snails live intertidally on sand and mud, at depths of 9 to 503 m. They live in deeper waters in their northern range. They emerge only at night to feed.

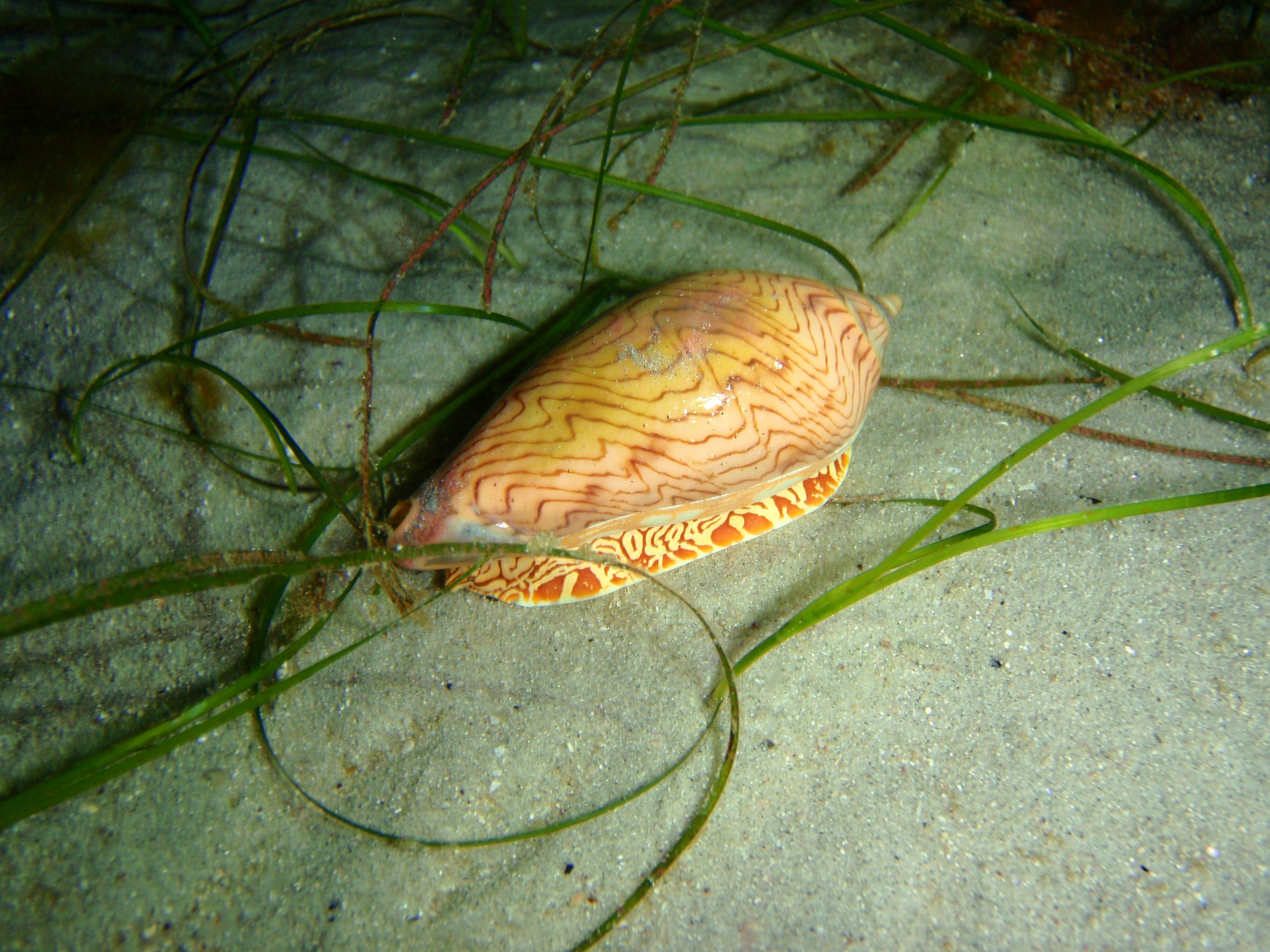
A live individual of Amoria undulata

== Biology ==
These gastropods are carnivore, mainly feeding on other sea snails. In the spring Amoria undulata migrates from deep water to shallow water sandbanks to breed. It lays egg masses similar to a hollow cylinder, with a diameter of 16–20 millimetres (0.63–0.79 in). The embryos hatch as well developed juveniles and crawl away.

== Bibliography ==
- A. G. Hinton – Guide to Australian Shells
- Bail P. & Limpus A. (2001) The genus Amoria. In: G.T. Poppe & K. Groh (eds) A conchological iconography. Hackenheim: Conchbooks. 50 pp., 93 pls
- Harald Douté, M. A. Fontana Angioy – Volutes, The Doute collection
- Wilson, B. (1993). Australian Marine Shells Part 2
