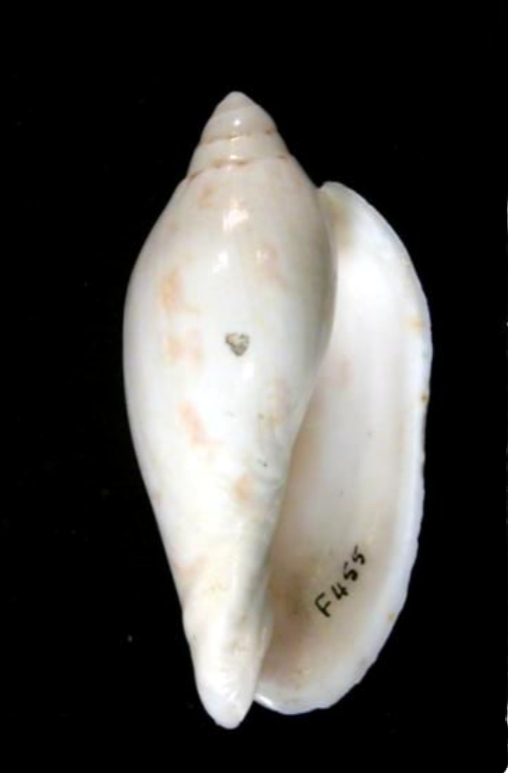
- apertural view of the shell of Amoria spenceriana (holotype at Museums Victoria)

Scientific classification
- Kingdom: Animalia
- Phylum: Mollusca
- Class: Gastropoda
- Subclass: Caenogastropoda
- Order: Neogastropoda
- Family: Volutidae
- Genus: Amoria
- Species: A. spenceriana

Binomial name
- Amoria spenceriana (Gatliff, 1908)

Synonyms
- Amoria (Amoria) spenceriana (Gatliff, 1908); Scaphella spenceriana (Gatliff, 1908); Voluta spenceriana Gatliff, 1908 (original combination)

= Amoria spenceriana =

Species of mollusc

Amoria spenceriana is a species of sea snail, a marine gastropod mollusk in the family Volutidae, the volutes.

The species was named in honour of the professor W. Baldwin Spencer C.M.G. in recognition of his many valued services to the natural history of Australia.

== Description ==
The white, fusiform shell is smooth and polished. It grows to a length of 60 mm. The shell is marked with light, yellowish-brown. The interior of the shell is salmon tinted. A few irregular linear markings run down from the suture. There are two series of broad, equidistant bands of distant zig-zag lines on the body whorl. The shell is spotted below the suture with the spots ceasing on the penultimate whorl. The remaining spiral whorls contain no markings.

The apex is blunt. The spire is short with 6 1/2 whorls, including the protoconch. The suture is well defined on the later whorls and becomes strongly channeled at the aperture. The outer lip is anteriorly expanded. The edge of the shell is acute. The body whorl is somewhat inflated at the upper portion. The columella bears three ascending plates.

== Distribution ==
This marine species is endemic to Australia and occurs on the Ashmore Reef, Western Australia.
