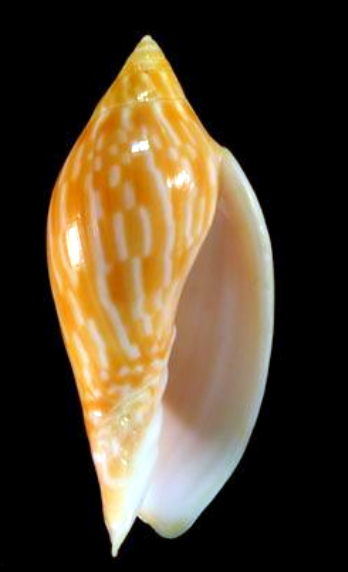
- Shell of Amoria lineola (specimen at the Natural History Museum Rotterdam)

Scientific classification
- Kingdom: Animalia
- Phylum: Mollusca
- Class: Gastropoda
- Subclass: Caenogastropoda
- Order: Neogastropoda
- Family: Volutidae
- Genus: Amoria
- Species: A. lineola

Binomial name
- Amoria lineola Bail & Limpus, 2009

Synonyms
- Amoria (Amoria) lineola Bail, P. & Limpus, A. 2009

= Amoria lineola =

Species of gastropod

Amoria lineola is a species of sea snail, a marine gastropod mollusc in the family Volutidae, the volutes.

== Description ==
The length of the shell varies between 35 mm and 50 mm.

== Distribution ==
This marine species is endemic to Australia and occurs off Queensland.
