= Amoria mihali =

Scientific classification
- Kingdom: Animalia
- Phylum: Mollusca
- Class: Gastropoda
- Subclass: Caenogastropoda
- Order: Neogastropoda
- Family: Volutidae
- Genus: Amoria
- Species: A. mihali

Binomial name
- Amoria mihali H. Morrison, 2018

Synonyms
- Amoria (Amoria) mihali H. Morrison, 2018 alternative representation

Species of gastropod

Amoria mihali is a species of sea snail, a marine gastropod mollusk in the family Volutidae, the volutes.

== Distribution ==
This marine species is endemic to Australia and occurs in the Timor Sea, Northern Territory.
