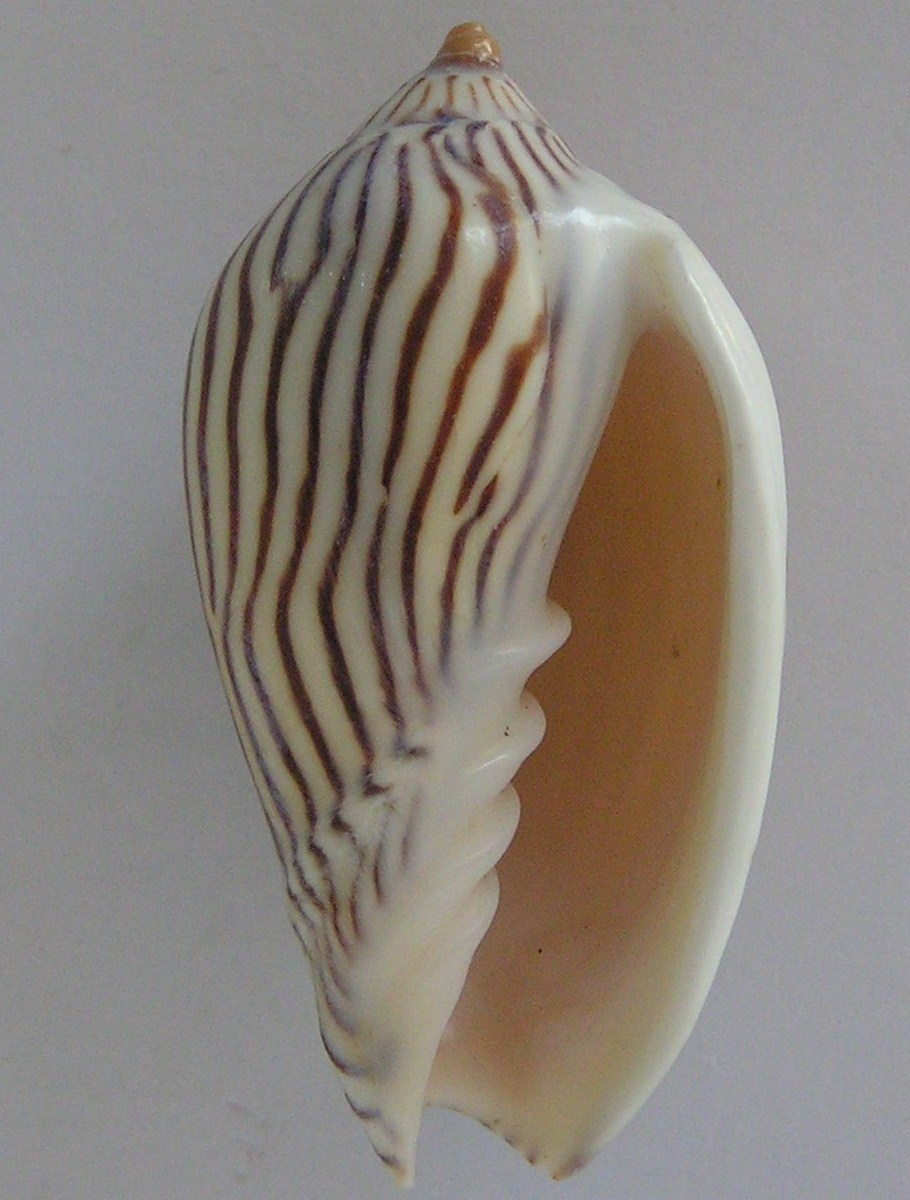
- Apertural view of a shell of Amoria zebra

Scientific classification
- Kingdom: Animalia
- Phylum: Mollusca
- Class: Gastropoda
- Subclass: Caenogastropoda
- Order: Neogastropoda
- Family: Volutidae
- Genus: Amoria
- Subgenus: Amoria
- Species: A. zebra

Binomial name
- Amoria zebra (Leach, 1814)

= Amoria zebra =

Species of gastropod

Amoria zebra, common name the zebra volute, is a species of sea snail, a marine gastropod mollusk in the family Volutidae, the volutes.

== Synonyms ==
- Amoria (Amoria) zebra (Leach, 1814)
- Amoria (Zebramoria) lineata (Leach, 1814) ·
- Marginella radiata Lamarck, 1822
- Voluta lineata Leach, 1814
- Voluta stragulata Megerle von Mühlfeldt, 1829
- Voluta zebra Leach, 1814 (original combination)
- Zebramoria lineata (Leach, 1814) ·
- Zebramoria lineatiana Weaver & du Pont, 1967

== Description ==
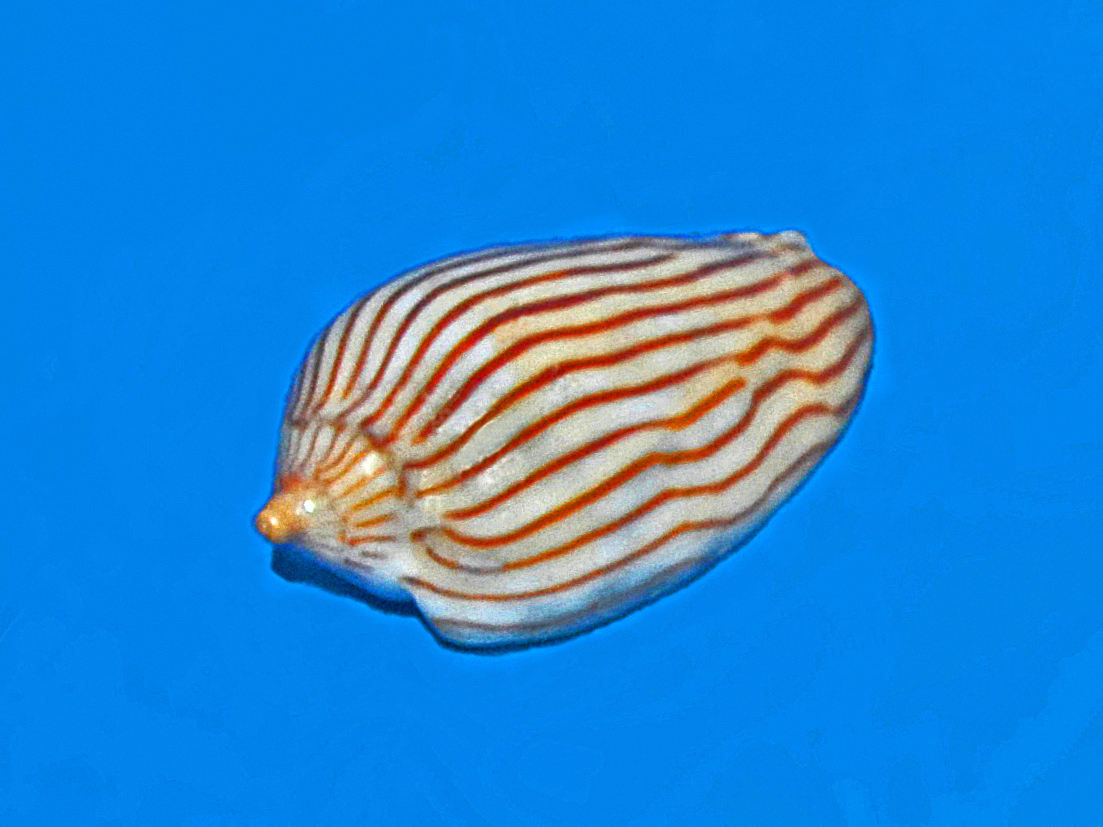
A Shell of Amoria zebra

The length of the shell varies between 25 mm and 55 mm. These shells are solid, glazed, with a short spire. Whorls are usually smooth and glossy. Columella is white and shows four strong plaits. The outer lip is thickened and smooth. The pattern of these shells is quite variable, in colour and in the density of the axial lines. The background colour varies from white to fawn or mid-brown, usually with axial brown lines.

== Distribution ==
This marine species occurs from North Australia to New South Wales.

== Habitat ==
These sea snails live in intertidal waters in sandy substrate, at depths of 5 to 55 m.

== Bibliography ==
- A. G. Hinton - Guide to Australian Shells
- Alan G. Hinton - Shells of New Guinea & Central Pacific
- Bail P. & Limpus A. (2001) The genus Amoria. In: G.T. Poppe & K. Groh (eds) A conchological iconography. Hackenheim: Conchbooks. 50 pp., 93 pls.
- Barry Wilson - Australian Marine Shells Part 2
- Harald Douté, M. A. Fontana Angioy - Volutes, The Doute collection
