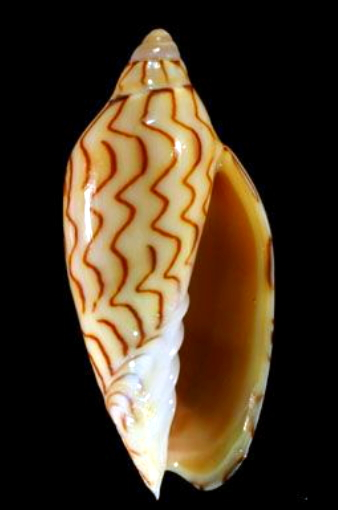
- Shell of Amoria macandrewi (specimen at the Natural History Museum Rotterdam)

Scientific classification
- Kingdom: Animalia
- Phylum: Mollusca
- Class: Gastropoda
- Subclass: Caenogastropoda
- Order: Neogastropoda
- Family: Volutidae
- Genus: Amoria
- Species: A. macandrewi

Binomial name
- Amoria macandrewi (Sowerby III, 1887)

Synonyms
- Amoria (Amoria) macandrewi (G.B. Sowerby III, 1887); Voluta macandrewi G.B. Sowerby III, 1887 (original combination)

= Amoria macandrewi =

Species of gastropod

Amoria macandrewi, common name MacAndrew's volute, is a species of sea snail, a marine gastropod mollusk in the family Volutidae, the volutes.

== Description ==
The length of the shell varies between 35 mm and 90 mm.

(Original description in Latin) The shell is subcylindrical and moderately robust. It exhibits a whitish ground color delicately tinged with pale brown or fulvous. It is adorned with beautifully painted, longitudinal, wavy brown lines. The spire is conical and relatively short, terminating in a slightly acute apex. The suture is nearly obscured by a white coating. The shell comprises six whorls, the initial three of which are convex and almost translucent, while the subsequent whorls are flatter. The aperture is relatively wide, with a dark throat. The columella is white and bears four prominent folds. The outer lip is relatively sharp, slightly arched, and deeply emarginated near the suture.

== Distribution ==
This marine species is endemic to Australia and occurs off Western Australia.
