= Amoria chaneyi =

Scientific classification
- Kingdom: Animalia
- Phylum: Mollusca
- Class: Gastropoda
- Subclass: Caenogastropoda
- Order: Neogastropoda
- Family: Volutidae
- Genus: Amoria
- Species: A. chaneyi

Binomial name
- Amoria chaneyi H. Morrison, 2012

Species of gastropod

Amoria chaneyi is a species of sea snail, a marine gastropod mollusk in the family Volutidae, the volutes.

== Description ==
The length of the shell varies between 36 mm and 63 mm.

== Distribution ==
This marine species is endemic to Australia and occurs off South Australia and Western Australia.
