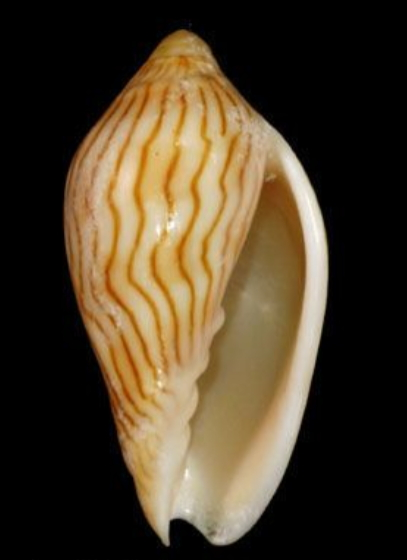
- Shell of Amoria benthalis (specimen at the Natural History Museum, Rotterdam)

Scientific classification
- Kingdom: Animalia
- Phylum: Mollusca
- Class: Gastropoda
- Subclass: Caenogastropoda
- Order: Neogastropoda
- Family: Volutidae
- Genus: Amoria
- Subgenus: Amoria
- Species: A. benthalis

Binomial name
- Amoria benthalis McMichael, 1964

Synonyms
- Amoria (Amorena) benthalis McMichael, 1964; Amoria (Amoria) benthalis McMichael, 1964; Amoria undulata benthalis (f) McMichael, 1964

= Amoria benthalis =

Species of gastropod

Amoria benthalis is a species of sea snail, a marine gastropod mollusk in the family Volutidae, the volutes.

== Description ==
The length of the shell varies between 28 mm and 43 mm.

McMicheal was the first to describe them in 1964: "The shell is small and robust, with a short spire and a bluntly rounded apex. The suture is glazed over. The body whorl is large and exhibits a weak shoulder.

The protoconch consists of 2 smooth and highly polished whorls, uniformly creamish-brown in color. The adult whorls (2½) are cream-colored, adorned with an ill-defined brown band positioned just beneath the suture. Two additional spiral bands of brown spots are present: one at the shoulder and another halfway between the shoulder and the anterior end of the shell. Numerous fine, longitudinal reddish-brown lines, spaced approximately 1-2 mm apart, traverse the shell. These lines exhibit slight undulations with two peaks coinciding with the positions of the brown spot bands. The anterior end of the shell is suffused with brown.

The aperture is gaping, displaying a color range from white to orange. Four strong plaits are present within the aperture. The fasciole is weakly developed.

The animal is unknown."

== Distribution ==
This marine species is endemic to Australia and have been found off Cape Moreton, Queensland, to Ballina, New South Wales. They live on muddy sand bottoms at depths of 146–229 m.
