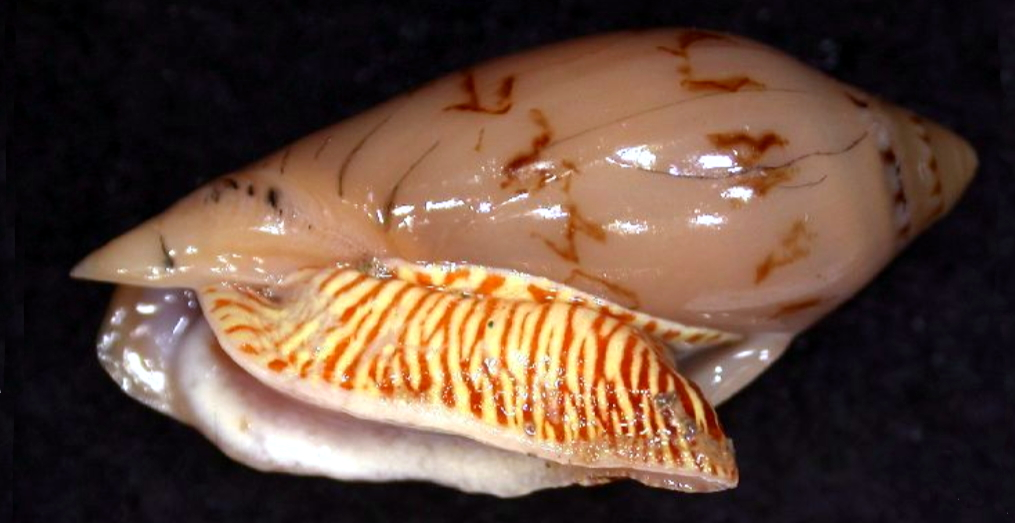
- Shell and live animal of Amoria diamantina (specimen at CSIRO Marine Invertebrates Image Collection (MIIC))

Scientific classification
- Kingdom: Animalia
- Phylum: Mollusca
- Class: Gastropoda
- Subclass: Caenogastropoda
- Order: Neogastropoda
- Family: Volutidae
- Genus: Amoria
- Species: A. diamantina

Binomial name
- Amoria diamantina Wilson, 1972

Synonyms
- Amoria (Amoria) diamantina Wilson, 1972

= Amoria diamantina =

Species of gastropod

Amoria diamantina is a species of sea snail, a marine gastropod mollusk in the family Volutidae, the volutes.

== Description ==
The length of the shell varies between 40 mm and 80 mm.

== Distribution ==
This marine species is endemic to Australia and occurs off Western Australia, found at depths between 119 m and 220 m.
