= Amoria thorae =

Scientific classification
- Kingdom: Animalia
- Phylum: Mollusca
- Class: Gastropoda
- Subclass: Caenogastropoda
- Order: Neogastropoda
- Family: Volutidae
- Genus: Amoria
- Species: A. thorae

Binomial name
- Amoria thorae J. M. Healy, 2020

Species of mollusc

Amoria thorae is a species of sea snail, a marine gastropod mollusk in the family Volutidae, the volutes.

== Distribution ==
This marine species is endemic to Australia and occurs off Cape Moreton, Queensland and Tweed Heads, New South Wales.
