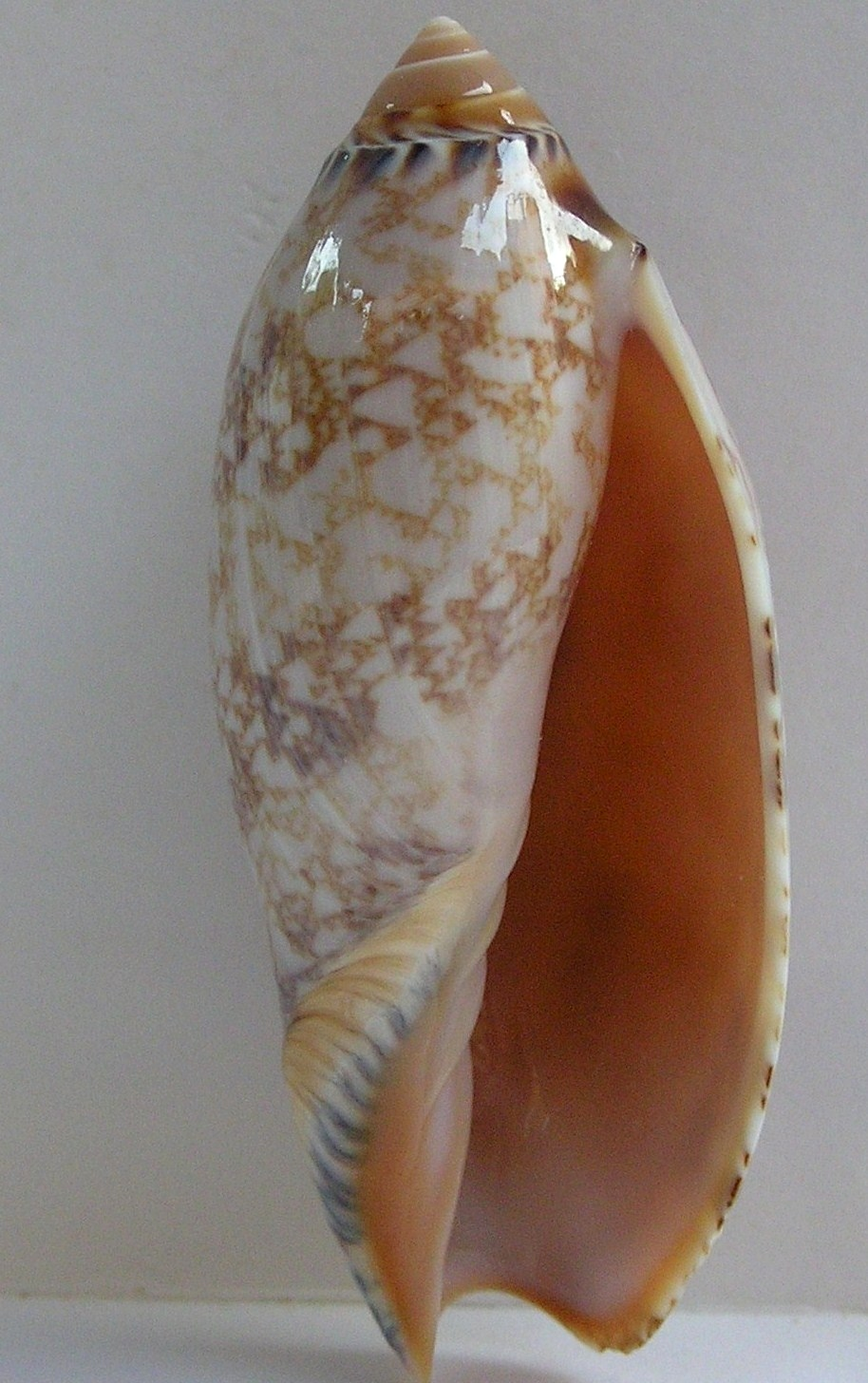
- An apertural view of the shell of Damon's volute, Amoria damonii

Scientific classification
- Kingdom: Animalia
- Phylum: Mollusca
- Class: Gastropoda
- Subclass: Caenogastropoda
- Order: Neogastropoda
- Family: Volutidae
- Tribe: Amoriini
- Genus: Amoria; Gray, 1855

Type species
- Voluta turneri Gray in Griffith & Pidgeon, 1834

Species
- See text

Synonyms
- Amorena Iredale, 1929; Amoria (Amorena) Iredale, 1929; Amoria (Amoria) Gray, 1855; Amoria (Cymbiolista) Iredale, 1929; Amoria (Zebramoria) Iredale, 1929; Canamoria Bondarev, 1995; Cymbiolena (Cymbiolista) Iredale, 1929; Cymbiolista Iredale, 1929; Voluta (Amoria) J. E. Gray, 1855 superseded rank; Zebramoria Iredale, 1929

= Amoria (gastropod) =

Genus of sea snails

Amoria is a taxonomic genus of medium-sized predatory marine gastropod in the subfamily Amoriinae, belonging to the family Volutidae.

== Distribution ==
Amoria are found in onshore and offshore waters around the entire coast of Australia. Several species extend into offshore waters of southern Indonesia. The highest areas of diversity are in the intertidal and shallow subtidal waters of northern Western Australia followed by the subtidal waters around the Great Barrier Reef in Queensland.

== Shell description ==
Amoria have a small, smooth, more or less pointed conical protoconch, a solid very glossy, fusiform shell and an elongate aperture with 4 distinct, more or less developed columellar plicae. The sutures are slightly callous. The colour pattern of the genus Amoria is variable, the base colour is white, yellow or pink with varying degrees or brown axial lines forming a pattern over the base colour. Axial lines may be free or may reticulate to form a tented pattern.

The largest species Amoria hunteri reaches over 200 mm in length. The smallest species is probably Amoria dampieria frequently around 20 mm.

== Biology ==
Amoria are nocturnal and prey on other gastropods and on bivalves. They generally inhabit areas with well sorted coarse sand. Some Amoria species have been noted to bite people when they are handled. The bite is followed by a mild sting, but no long-term effects have been noted.

== Fossil history ==
The first Amoria appear in the Eocene and Late Miocene from Victoria. Judging from anatomical features, Amoria are close to the genus Cymbiola from which they descended in the Tertiary. Cymbiola are related to Tethyan species of the Late Miocene of Indonesia, Java.

== Taxonomy ==
Amoria includes more than 70 species, synonyms included. The following species have been recognized:

- Amoria austellus H. Morrison & B. Schneider, 2021
- Amoria benthalis McMichael, 1964 - Queensland, New South Wales
- Amoria canaliculata McCoy, 1869 - Queensland
- Amoria chaneyi Morrison, 2012
- † Amoria costellifera (Tate, 1889)
- Amoria damonii Gray, 1864 - Western and Northern Australia
- Amoria dampieria Weaver, 1960 - Dampier Archipelago
- Amoria diamantina Wilson, 1972 - Western Australia
- Amoria ellioti (G.B. Sowerby II, 1864) - Western Australia
- Amoria exoptanda (Reeve, 1849) - Southern Australia
- Amoria grayi Ludbrook, 1953 - Western Australia
- Amoria guttata McMichael, 1964 - Queensland
- Amoria hansenae Morrison, 2012
- Amoria hunteri (Iredale, 1931) - Eastern Australia
- Amoria jamrachii Gray, 1864 - Western Australia
- Amoria jansae van Pel & Moolenbeek, 2010
- Amoria lineola Bail & Limpus, 2009
- Amoria macandrewi (G.B. Sowerby III, 1887) - Western Australia
- Amoria maculata (Swainson, 1822) - Eastern Australia
- Amoria marshallorum H. Morrison & B. Schneider, 2021
- † Amoria masoni (Tate, 1889)
- Amoria mihali H. Morrison, 2018
- Amoria necopinata Darragh, 1983 - Queensland
- Amoria peterstimpsoni Cossignani & Allary, 2019
- Amoria praetexta (Reeve, 1849) - Western Australia
- Amoria rinkensi Poppe, 1986 - Northwestern Australia
- Amoria ryosukei Habe, 1975 - Arafura, Timor Sea
- Amoria simoneae Bail & Limpus, 2003
- Amoria spenceriana (Gatliff, 1908) - Ashmore Reef
- Amoria stricklandi Bail & Limpus, 2016
- Amoria subfossilis Bail & Limpus, 2011
- Amoria thorae J. M. Healy, 2020
- Amoria turneri (Griffith & Pidgeon, 1834) - Western and Northern Australia
- Amoria undulata (Lamarck, 1804) - Western, Southern and Eastern Australia
- Amoria weldensis Bail & Limpus, 2001 - Western Australia
- Amoria zebra (Leach, 1814) - Eastern Australia

Species brought into synonymy

- Amoria grossi Iredale, 1927: synonym of Volutoconus grossi (Iredale, 1927) (original combination)
- Amoria kawamurai Habe, 1975 - Arafura, Timor Sea: synonym of the subspecies Amoria grayi kawamurai Habe, 1975
- Amoria kingi Cox, 1871: synonym of Amoria undulata (Lamarck, 1804)
- Amoria molleri (Iredale, 1936): synonym of Relegamoria molleri Iredale, 1936 (superseded combination)
- Amoria newmanae Cotton, 1949: synonym of Amoria turneri (Gray in Griffith & Pidgeon, 1834)

Many subspecific names have been created in the genus Amoria to distinguish colour variations in the shells of the species.
