= Protein-fragment complementation assay =

Within the field of molecular biology, a protein-fragment complementation assay, or PCA, is a method for the identification and quantification of protein–protein interactions. In the PCA, the proteins of interest ("bait" and "prey") are each covalently linked to fragments of a third protein (e.g. DHFR, which acts as a "reporter"). Interaction between the bait and the prey proteins brings the fragments of the reporter protein in close proximity to allow them to form a functional reporter protein whose activity can be measured. This principle can be applied to many different reporter proteins and is also the basis for the yeast two-hybrid system, an archetypical PCA assay.

== Split protein assays ==
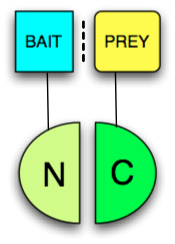
General principle of the protein complementation assay: a protein is split into two (N- and C-terminal) halves and reconstituted by two interacting proteins that are fused to the N and C halves (here called "bait" and "prey" because a bait protein can be used to find an interacting prey protein). The activity of the reconstituted protein should be easily detectable, e.g. as in the green fluorescent protein (GFP).

Any protein that can be split into two parts and reconstituted non-covalently to form a functional protein may be used in a PCA. The two fragments however have low affinity for each other and must be brought together by other interacting proteins fused to them (often called "bait" and "prey" since the bait protein can be used to identify a prey protein, see figure). The protein that produces a detectable readout is called "reporter". Usually enzymes which confer resistance to nutrient deprivation or antibiotics, such as dihydrofolate reductase or beta-lactamase respectively, or proteins that give colorimetric or fluorescent signals are used as reporters. When fluorescent proteins are reconstituted the PCA is called Bimolecular fluorescence complementation assay. The following proteins have been used in split protein PCAs:

- Beta-lactamase
- Dihydrofolate reductase (DHFR)
- Fluorescent proteins, including:
  - Green fluorescent protein (GFP) and enhanced GFP (eGFP)
  - Infrared fluorescent protein IFP1.4, an engineered chromophore-binding domain (CBD) of a bacteriophytochrome from Deinococcus radiodurans
- Focal adhesion kinase (FAK)
- Gal4, a yeast transcription factor (as in the classical yeast two-hybrid system)
- Horseradish peroxidase (HRP)
- LacZ (beta-galactosidase)
- Luciferases, including:
  - Firefly luciferase
  - Renilla luciferase (RLuc)
  - Gaussia luciferase (GLuc)
  - Nanoluciferase (NLuc), such as in commercial products like NanoBIT.
- FAST (splitFAST)
- Tobacco etch virus protease (TEV)
- Ubiquitin

== Genome-wide applications ==
The methods mentioned above have been applied to whole genomes, e.g. yeast or syphilis bacteria.
