= Watasenia-luciferin 2-monooxygenase =

Identifiers
- EC no.: 1.13.12.8

Databases
- IntEnz: IntEnz view
- BRENDA: BRENDA entry
- ExPASy: NiceZyme view
- KEGG: KEGG entry
- MetaCyc: metabolic pathway
- PRIAM: profile
- PDB structures: RCSB PDB PDBe PDBsum
- Gene Ontology: AmiGO / QuickGO
Search
- PMC: articles
- PubMed: articles
- NCBI: proteins

Watasenia-luciferin 2-monooxygenase (EC 1.13.12.8) is an enzyme that catalyzes the chemical reaction

Watasenia luciferin + O_{2} $\rightleftharpoons$ oxidized Watasenia luciferin + CO_{2} + photon hν

The two substrates of this enzyme are Watasenia luciferin and oxygen. Its products are oxidized Watasenia luciferin, carbon dioxide, and a photon of light.

The structure of the Watasenia luciferin is similar to that of coelenterazine, another common luciferin, but with sulfate groups attached to each phenolic oxygen atom. The corresponding reaction for Renilla-luciferin 2-monooxygenase is:

coelenterazine
O_{2}
CO_{2}
coelenteramide
+ hν

Watasenia luciferin belongs to the family of oxidoreductases, specifically, those acting on single donors with O_{2} as oxidant and incorporation of two atoms of oxygen into the substrate (oxygenases). The oxygen incorporated need not be derived from O with the incorporation of one atom of oxygen (internal monooxygenases o internal mixed-function oxidases). The systematic name of this enzyme class is Watasenia-luciferin:oxygen 2-oxidoreductase (decarboxylating). This enzyme is also called Watasenia-type luciferase.
