= Igor Stagljar =

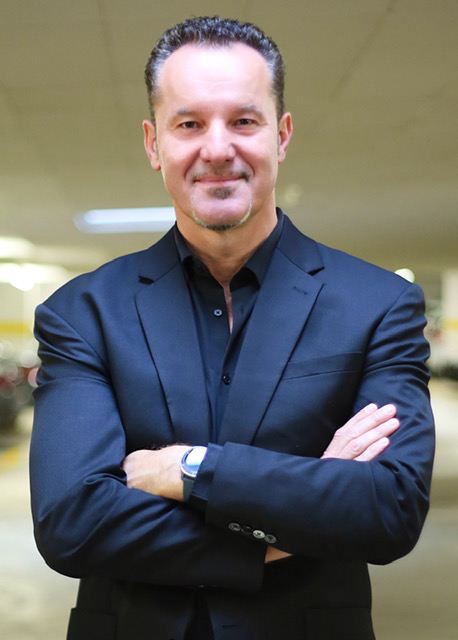
- Born: 1966 (age 59–60); Zagreb
- Education: Faculty of Science, University of Zagreb
- Partner: Darija Jašić
- Scientific career
- Fields: Molecular biology
- Workplaces: University of Toronto

Igor Stagljar is a Canadian molecular biologist who was born in Croatia. He is a professor of Molecular Genetics and Biochemistry at Donnelly Centre at the Medical School of the University of Toronto, and is also a Co-Director and Laboratory Head at the Mediterranean Institute of Life Sciences in Split (Croatia). He is an expert in the field of proteomics, cancer cell signalling and COVID-19 serological testing.

== Education ==
He received a BSc. (1990) from the University of Zagreb (Croatia), and a Ph.D. (1995) in molecular biology from ETH Zurich (Switzerland).

== Career ==
In 2018, Stagljar announced that his lab had discovered a potential treatment for a subform of non-small cell lung cancer called lung adenocarcinoma, which is caused by a triple mutation in the EGFR gene. They found that two previously described kinase inhibitors, midostaurin and gilteritinib, inhibit the EGFR triple mutant, which was resistant to all known tyrosine kinase inhibitors, including osimertinib, the latest generation of TKIs, at that time. This discovery was published two years later in Nature Chemical Biology.

Stagljar has performed biomedical research to understand how proteins interact with each other to produce either healthy or diseased cell states. Over the years, his lab has studied interaction proteomics methods such as the split-ubiquitin Membrane Yeast Two-Hybrid (MYTH) Mammalian Membrane Two-Hybrid (MaMTH), Mammalian Membrane Two-Hybrid Drug Screening (MaMTH-DS), and Split Intein Mediated Protein Ligation (SIMPL) technologies.

During COVID-19 pandemic Stagljar and colleagues developed pinprick COVID-19 serological test named SATiN (Serological Assay based on split TrIpart Nanoluciferase) that accurately measures in under one hour concentration of coronavirus antibodies in blood of people either infected with SARS-CoV-2 or synthesized in their bodies post vaccination. SATiN was the first COVID-19 serology test that uses highly sensitive protein complementation chemistry which takes advantage of a modified form of luciferase – an enzyme that gives fireflies their light-emitting power through a biochemical reaction. In collaboration with Shawn Owen’s lab at the University of Utah, Stagljar and colleagues further modified SATiN and developed Neu-SATiN method that can be used to detect the presence and potency of neutralizing antibodies against SARS-CoV-2.

Stagljar is a co-founder of Dualsystems Biotech Inc (Schlieren, Switzerland;) and Perturba Therapeutics (Toronto, Canada).)

== Awards ==
- Croatian Biological Society Plaque “Zdravko Lorkovic” by the Croatian Biological Society
- "Inventor of the Year” from the University of Toronto for contributing to Canada's innovation agenda and the advancement of knowledge in 2015

In 2022, Stagljar has been elected a member of the European Molecular Biology Organization (EMBO) as well as a fellow of the Royal Society of Canada, the highest honor that Canadian individuals can achieve in the Arts and Humanities, Social Sciences and Biomedicine
