= Oplophorus-luciferin 2-monooxygenase =

Class of enzymes

Identifiers
- EC no.: 1.13.12.13

Databases
- BRENDA: enzyme data
- ExPASy: NiceZyme view
- KEGG: enzyme entry
- MetaCyc: metabolic pathway
- Rhea: reactions
- PDB structures: RCSB PDB PDBe PDBsum
Search
- PMC: articles
- PubMed: articles
- NCBI: proteins

Oplophorus-luciferin 2-monooxygenase (EC 1.13.12.13), also known as Oplophorus luciferase (OpLuc), is a luciferase, an enzyme, from the deep-sea shrimp Oplophorus gracilirostris, belonging to a group of coelenterazine luciferases. Unlike other luciferases, it has a broader substrate specificity and can also bind to bisdeoxycoelenterazine efficiently. It was the third example of a luciferase (Other than Aequorea and Renilla) to be purified in lab. The systematic name of this enzyme class is Oplophorus-luciferin:oxygen 2-oxidoreductase (decarboxylating).

== Chemical reaction ==
The two substrates of this enzyme are the luciferin, coelenterazine and oxygen. Its products are the oxyluciferin, coelenteramide, carbon dioxide, and a photon. It belongs to the family of oxidoreductases, specifically those acting on single donors with O_{2} as oxidant and initial incorporation of two atoms of oxygen into the substrate. Although the enzyme is part of the group of enzymes that act on coelenterazine, such as Renilla and Gaussia luciferases, it does not share base pair sequences with these enzymes.

OpLuc catalyzes the ATP independent chemical reaction:

coelenterazine
O_{2}
CO_{2}
coelenteramide
+ hν

The result of this process is loss of CO_{2} and emission of a photon of blue light at ~460 nm. This reaction has an optimal pH of 9, optimal salt concentration of 0.05-0.1 M, and optimal temperature of ~40 C (making it an unusually heat resistant luciferase), although because O.gracilirostris are deep sea animals living in below 20 C temperatures, luciferase is normally expressed and folded at low temperatures.

== Biological function ==
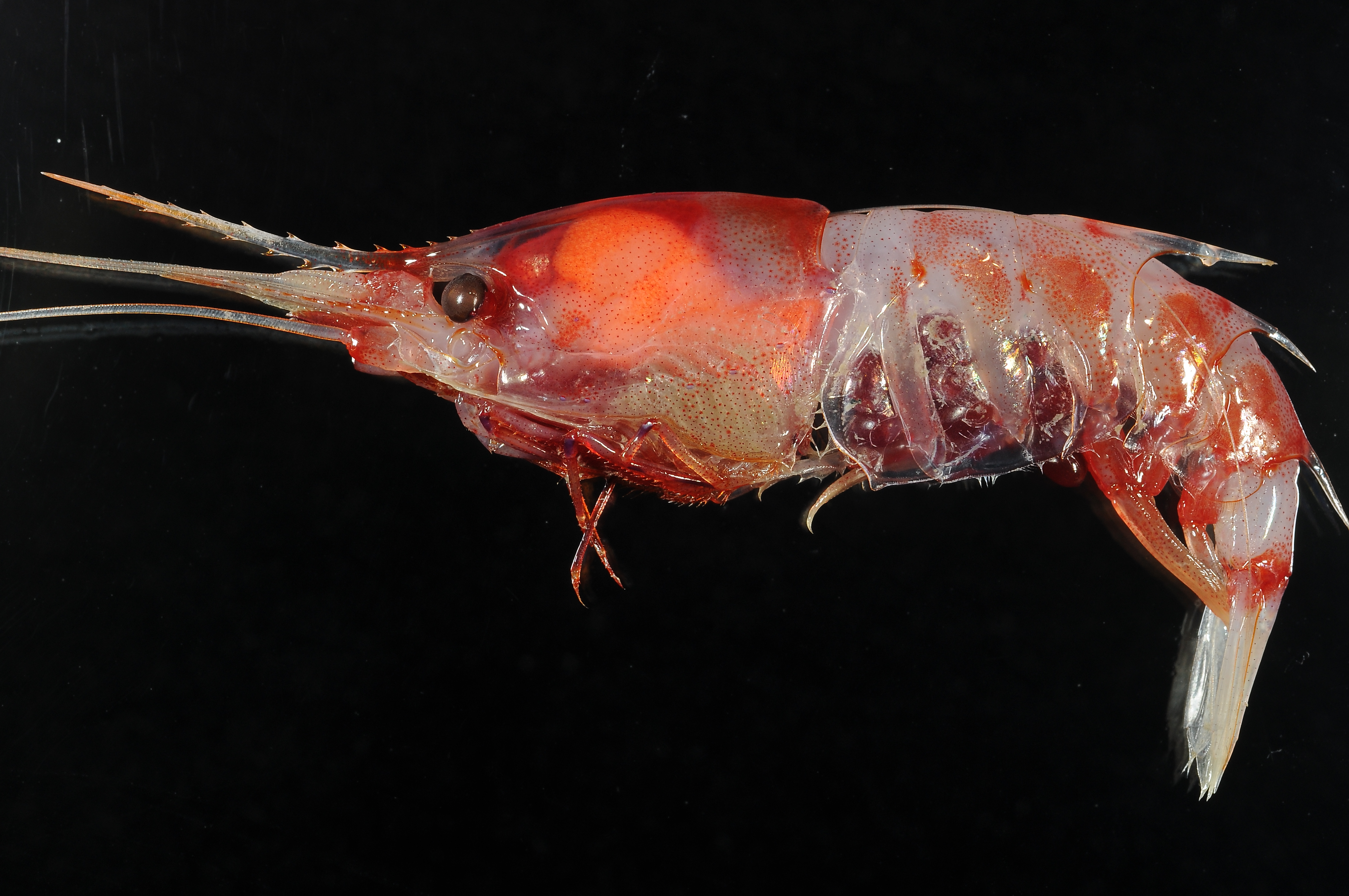
Oplophorus gracilirostris

When stimulated in Oplophorus gracilirostris, OpLuc is secreted from the base of legs and antennae of the deep-sea shrimp as a defense mechanism. This mechanism causes O.gracilirostris release a luminous, bright blue luciferase cloud. There are many species of shrimp which display similar bioluminescence.

== Structure ==
OpLuc is a complex of two covalently bonded protein subunits: two molecules of 19 kDa and two molecules of 35 kDa components, making it a heterotetrameric molecule. The proteins signal the enzyme for secretion in luminescence, catalyzed by the protein 19 kDa. The luciferase has many cysteine residues that stabilize the enzyme in extracellular environments using disulfide bonds.

=== 19 kDa Protein (KAZ) ===
The catalytic component of OpLuc, known as KAZ, has 196 amino acids with one cysteine in the carboxyl terminus and is distinct from proteins found in other luciferases. The protein is made up of two domains with repetitive sequencing of Ia-c and Ila-d in the peptide chain. It is thought to be the protein to cause the bioluminescent reaction of O. gracilirostris, but functions ineffectively without its larger, subunit counterpart. The KAZ domain was isolated and mutated to create an engineered luciferase, known as nanoluciferase (NanoLuc, NLuc, or NanoKAZ), capable of catalyzing a bright and sustained luminescent reaction with a coelenterazine analogue (furimazine) that can be used as a cellular reporter. Additional substrates with increased aqueous solubility (hydrofurimazine, fluorofurimazine, cephalofurimazine, and cephalofurimazine-9) were later developed. Nluc has further been modified as part of protein-fragment complementation assays. Although the crystal structure of OpLuc has yet to be completely analyzed and mapped, Nluc has been crystalized and its structure determined.

=== 35 kDa Protein ===
The lesser known component of the OpLuc enzyme has 320 amino acids with 11 cysteine and 5 leucine molecules. The amino terminus of the protein was experimentally concluded to begin at 39 amino acids. It is thought to stabilize the KAZ domain and is not thought to be affect by substrate specificity, however its exact function is not known.
