= Coelenterazine =

Names
- IUPAC name 6-(4-Hydroxyphenyl)-2-[(4-hydroxyphenyl)methyl]-8-(phenylmethyl)-7H-imidazo[1,2-a]pyrazin-3-one
- Other names Renilla luciferin

Identifiers
CAS Number	55779-48-1
3D model (JSmol)	Interactive image
ChEBI	CHEBI:2311
ChemSpider	2728
ECHA InfoCard	100.164.960
KEGG	C15037
PubChem CID	135445694
UNII	3O1CB88RRD
CompTox Dashboard (EPA)	DTXSID80204342
- InChI: InChI=1S/C26H21N3O3/c30-20-10-6-18(7-11-20)15-23-26(32)29-16-24(19-8-12-21(31)13-9-19)27-22(25(29)28-23)14-17-4-2-1-3-5-17/h1-13,16,27,30-31H,14-15H2 Key: YHIPILPTUVMWQT-UHFFFAOYSA-N; InChI=1S/C26H21N3O3/c30-20-10-6-18(7-11-20)15-23-26(32)29-16-24(19-8-12-21(31)13-9-19)27-22(25(29)28-23)14-17-4-2-1-3-5-17/h1-13,16,27,30-31H,14-15H2
- SMILES: C1=CC=C(C=C1)CC2=C3N=C(C(=O)N3C=C(N2)C4=CC=C(C=C4)O)CC5=CC=C(C=C5)O

Properties
Chemical formula	C_{26}H_{21}N_{3}O_{3}
Molar mass	423.472 g·mol^{−1}
Appearance	Orange-yellow crystals
Melting point	175 to 178 °C (347 to 352 °F; 448 to 451 K)
Absorbance	ε_{435} = 9800 M^{−1} cm^{−1} (methanol)
- Except where otherwise noted, data are given for materials in their standard state (at 25 °C [77 °F], 100 kPa). Infobox references

Coelenterazine is a luciferin, a molecule that emits light after reaction with oxygen, found in many aquatic organisms across eight phyla. It is the substrate of many luciferases such as Renilla reniformis luciferase (Rluc), Gaussia luciferase (Gluc), and photoproteins, including aequorin, and obelin. All these proteins catalyze the oxidation of this substance, a reaction catalogued EC 1.13.12.5.

== History ==
Coelenterazine was simultaneously isolated and characterized by two groups studying the luminescent organisms sea pansy (Renilla reniformis) and the cnidarian Aequorea victoria, respectively. Both groups independently discovered that the same compound was used in both luminescent systems. The molecule was named after the now-obsolete phylum coelenterata. Likewise, the two main metabolites – coelenteramide and coelenteramine – were named after their respective functional groups. While coelenterazine was first discovered in Aequorea victoria, it was later shown that they do not synthesize coelenterazine, but obtain it through their diet, largely from crustaceans and copepods.

== Occurrence ==
Coelenterazine is widely found in marine organisms including:

- radiolarians
- ctenophores
- cnidarians such as Aequorea victoria, Obelia geniculata and Renilla reniformis
- squid such as Watasenia scintillans and Vampyroteuthis infernalis
- shrimp such as Systellaspis debilis and Oplophorus gracilirostris
- copepods such as Pleuromamma xiphias, Gaussia princeps and Metridia lucens
- chaetognaths
- fish including some Neoscopelidae and Myctophidae
- echinoderms such as Amphiura filiformis

The compound has also been isolated from organisms that are not luminescent, such as the Atlantic herring and several shrimp species including Pandalus borealis and Pandalus platyuros.

The compound is generally used by luciferases internal to the organism, but in the copepod Metridia longa the luciferase is secreted into extracellular space, an unusual property.

== Biosynthesis ==
Biosynthesis of coelenterazine in Metridia starts from two molecules of tyrosine and one molecule of phenylalanine, and some researchers believe this comes in the form of a cyclized "Phe-Tyr-Tyr" (FYY) peptide. As of 2025 the full details of the pathway were not known.

== Properties ==
Coelenterazine can be crystallized into orange-yellow crystals. The molecule absorbs light in the ultraviolet and visible spectrum, with peak absorption at 435 nm in methanol, giving the molecule a yellow color. The molecule spontaneously oxidizes in aerobic conditions or in some organic solvents such as dimethylformamide and DMSO and is preferentially stored in methanol or with an inert gas.

=== Bioluminescence ===
Enzymes such as renilla-luciferin 2-monooxygenase are responsible for the bioluminescence observed in the organisms which contain coelenterazine by catalyzing the chemical reaction

coelenterazine
O_{2}
CO_{2}
coelenteramide
+ hν

In the process, coelenterazine is oxidized with a concurrent loss of carbon dioxide, and a photon of blue light is emitted.

== Synthetic coelenterazine derivatives ==
To improve its biophysical properties, derivatives of coelenterazine have been synthesized by means of different procedures including multicomponent strategies.

== See also ==
- Furimazine
- Vargulin
