= Firefly luciferase =

Light-emitting enzyme

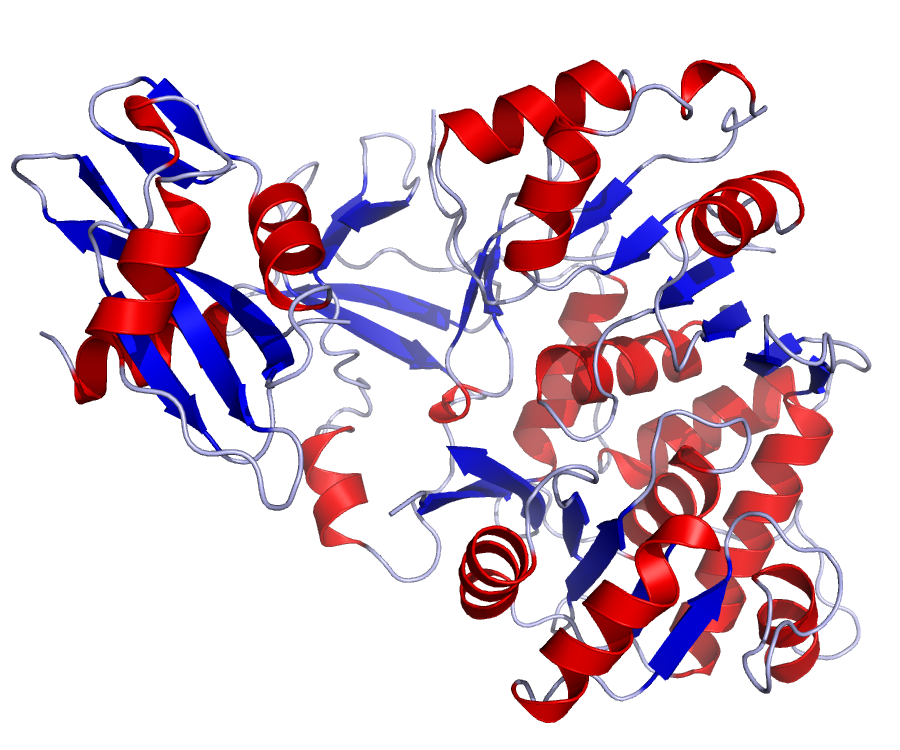
- Structure of Photinus pyralis firefly luciferase.

Identifiers
- Organism: Photinus pyralis
- Symbol: N/A
- Orthologs: OMA: entry
- PDB: 1LCI
- UniProt: P08659
Search for
- Structures: Swiss-model
- Domains: InterPro

Firefly luciferase

Identifiers
- EC no.: 1.13.12.7

Databases
- BRENDA: enzyme data
- ExPASy: NiceZyme view
- KEGG: enzyme entry
- MetaCyc: metabolic pathway
- Rhea: reactions
- PDB structures: RCSB PDB PDBe PDBsum
- Gene Ontology: AmiGO / QuickGO
Search
- PMC: articles
- PubMed: articles
- NCBI: proteins

Firefly luciferase is the light-emitting enzyme responsible for the bioluminescence of fireflies and click beetles. The enzyme catalyses the oxidation of firefly luciferin, requiring oxygen and ATP. Because of the requirement of ATP, firefly luciferases have been used extensively in biotechnology.

== Mechanism of reaction ==
The chemical reaction catalyzed by firefly luciferase takes place in two steps:

- luciferin + ATP → luciferyl adenylate + PP_{i}
- luciferyl adenylate + O_{2} → oxyluciferin + AMP + light

Light is produced because the reaction forms oxyluciferin in an electronically excited state. The reaction releases a photon of light as oxyluciferin goes back to the ground state.

Luciferyl adenylate can additionally participate in a side reaction with O_{2} to form hydrogen peroxide and dehydroluciferyl-AMP. About 20% of the luciferyl adenylate intermediate is oxidized in this pathway.

Firefly luciferase generates light from luciferin in a multistep process. First, D-luciferin is adenylated by MgATP to form luciferyl adenylate and pyrophosphate. After activation by ATP, luciferyl adenylate is oxidized by molecular oxygen to form a dioxetanone ring. A decarboxylation reaction forms an excited state of oxyluciferin, which tautomerizes between the keto-enol form. The reaction finally emits light as oxyluciferin returns to the ground state.

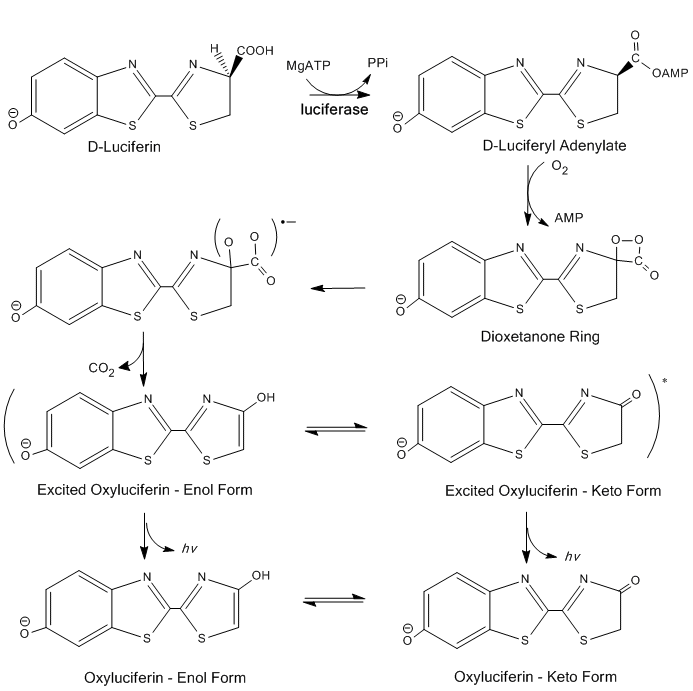
Mechanism for luciferase.

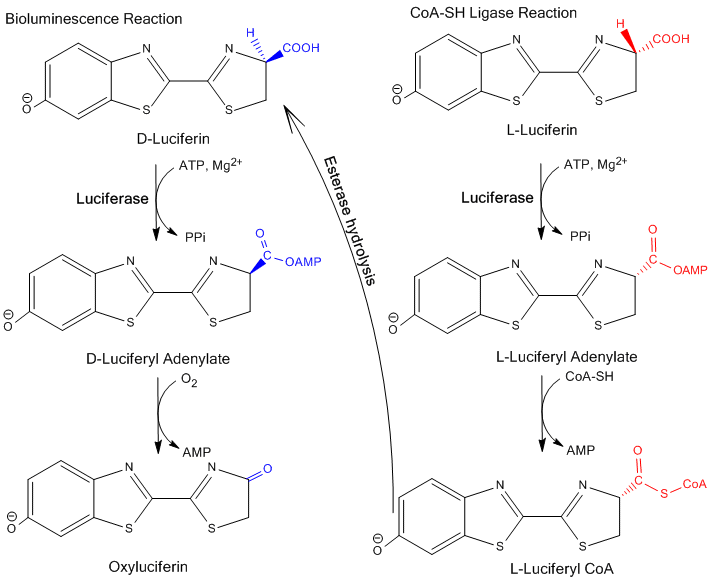
Luciferase has two modes of enzyme activity: bioluminescence activity and CoA synthetase activity.

== Bifunctionality ==
Luciferase can function in two different pathways: a bioluminescence pathway and a CoA-ligase pathway. In both pathways, luciferase initially catalyzes an adenylation reaction with MgATP. However, in the CoA-ligase pathway, CoA can displace AMP to form luciferyl CoA.

Fatty acyl-CoA synthetase similarly activates fatty acids with ATP, followed by displacement of AMP with CoA. Because of their similar activities, luciferase is able to replace fatty acyl-CoA synthetase and convert long-chain fatty acids into fatty-acyl CoA for beta oxidation.

== Structure ==
The protein structure of firefly luciferase consists of 550 amino acids in two compact domains: the N-terminal domain and the C-terminal domain. The N-terminal domain is composed of two β-sheets in an αβαβα structure and a β barrel. The two β-sheets stack on top of each other, with the β-barrel covering the end of the sheets.

The C-terminal domain is connected to the N-terminal domain by a flexible hinge, which can separate the two domains. The amino acid sequences on the surface of the two domains facing each other are conserved in bacterial and firefly luciferase, thereby strongly suggesting that the active site is located in the cleft between the domains.

During a reaction, luciferase has a conformational change and goes into a "closed" form with the two domains coming together to enclose the substrate. This ensures that water is excluded from the reaction and does not hydrolyze ATP or the electronically excited product.

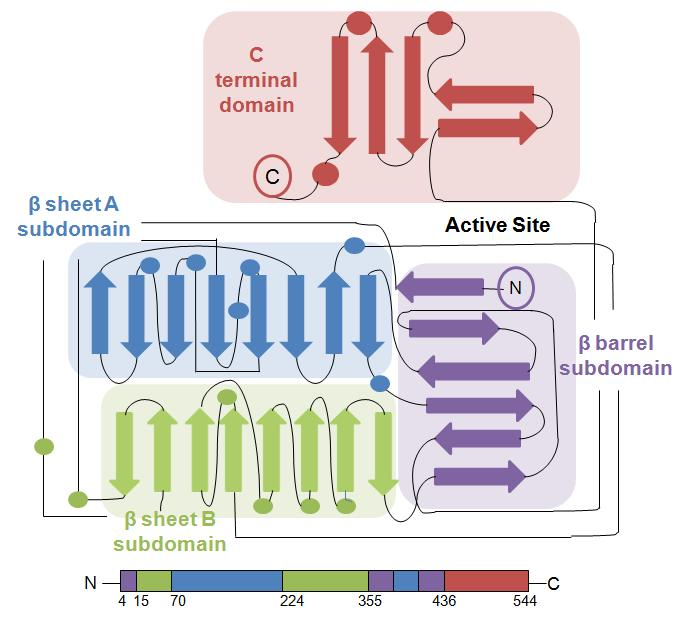
Diagram of the secondary structure of firefly luciferase. Arrows represent β-strands and circles represent α-helices. The locations of each of the subdomains in the sequence of luciferase is shown in the bottom diagram.

== Spectral differences in bioluminescence ==
Firefly luciferase bioluminescence color can vary between yellow-green (λ_{max} = 550 nm) to red (λ_{max} = 620). There are currently several different mechanisms describing how the structure of luciferase affects the emission spectrum of the photon and effectively the color of light emitted.

One mechanism proposes that the color of the emitted light depends on whether the product is in the keto or enol form. The mechanism suggests that red light is emitted from the keto form of oxyluciferin, while green light is emitted from the enol form of oxyluciferin. However, 5,5-dimethyloxyluciferin emits green light even though it is constricted to the keto form because it cannot tautomerize.

Another mechanism proposes that twisting the angle between benzothiazole and thiazole rings in oxyluciferin determines the color of bioluminescence. This explanation proposes that a planar form, with an angle of 0° between the two rings, corresponds to a higher energy state and emits a higher-energy green light, whereas an angle of 90° puts the structure in a lower energy state and emits a lower-energy red light.

The most recent explanation for the bioluminescence color examines the microenvironment of the excited oxyluciferin. Studies suggest that the interactions between the excited state product and nearby residues can force the oxyluciferin into an even higher energy form, which results in the emission of green light. For example, Arg 218 has electrostatic interactions with other nearby residues, restricting oxyluciferin from tautomerizing to the enol form. Similarly, other results have indicated that the microenvironment of luciferase can force oxyluciferin into a more rigid, high-energy structure, forcing it to emit a high-energy green light.

== Regulation ==
D-luciferin is the substrate for firefly luciferase's bioluminescence reaction, while L-luciferin is the substrate for luciferyl-CoA synthetase activity. Both reactions are inhibited by the substrate's enantiomer: L-luciferin and D-luciferin inhibit the bioluminescence pathway and the CoA-ligase pathway, respectively. This shows that luciferase can differentiate between the isomers of the luciferin structure.

L-luciferin is able to emit a weak light even though it is a competitive inhibitor of D-luciferin and the bioluminescence pathway. Light is emitted because the CoA synthesis pathway can be converted to the bioluminescence reaction by hydrolyzing the final product via an esterase back to D-luciferin.

Luciferase activity is additionally inhibited by oxyluciferin and allosterically activated by ATP. When ATP binds to the enzyme's two allosteric sites, luciferase's affinity to bind ATP in its active site increases.

== Homology ==
Firefly luciferase is thought to be a homolog of long-chain fatty acyl-CoA synthetase because of its ability to synthesize luciferyl-CoA from CoA and dehydroluciferyl-AMP. Inouye tested this hypothesis in 2010 by expressing the cDNA of Photinus pyralis and Lychocoriolaus lateralis luciferase in E. coli through cold shock gene expression. The resulting enzymes were then exposed to long-chain fatty acids, short-chain fatty acids, amino acids, and imino acids. Unsurprisingly, Inouye found that the luciferases only showed adenylation activity when exposed to long-chain fatty acids.

The gene product of CG6178 in Drosophila was also found to have high amino acid sequence similarity with firefly luciferase. While it did show high adenylation activity when exposed to long-chain fatty acids, there was no luminescence when exposed to oxygen and LH_{2}-AMP– further suggesting that luciferase emerged as a long-chain fatty acyl-CoA homolog due to gene duplication.

== Evolution ==
Phylogenetic analyses performed by Zhang et al.. (2020) suggest that the luciferases of the Lampyridae, Rhagopthalmidae, and Phenogodidae families diverged from the Elateridae family 205 Mya. According to phylogenetic data, the emergence of these two luciferases appeared even before the families could diverge, indicating their analogous nature due to phenotypic convergence.

== See also ==
- Bioluminescence imaging
