= Gaussia =

Gaussia may refer to:

- Gaussia (crustacean), a copepod genus in the family Metridinidae and the order Calanoida
- Gaussia (plant), a palm genus in the family Arecaceae
