= Gaussia princeps =

Gaussia princeps may refer to:

- Gaussia princeps (plant), a palm species endemic to Cuba
- Gaussia princeps (crustacean), a mesopelagic copepod species found in the Pacific Ocean

== See also ==
- G. princeps (disambiguation)
