= Metridia pacifica =

Scientific classification
- Domain: Eukaryota
- Kingdom: Animalia
- Phylum: Arthropoda
- Class: Copepoda
- Order: Calanoida
- Family: Metridinidae
- Genus: Metridia
- Species: M. pacifica

Binomial name
- Metridia pacifica Brodsky, 1950

Species of crustacean

Metridia pacifica is a copepod found in the north Pacific and surrounding waters.

== Taxonomy ==
Metridia pacifica is most closely related to M. lucens; before being split by Brodsky based on morphological differences, these were considered to be the same species.

== Description ==
Metridia pacifica has a clear body with a whitish tint. In terms of length, females are range from about 2.4 to 3.5 millimetres (0.094 to 0.138 in), and males are usually between about 1.7 and 2.6 millimetres (0.067 and 0.102 in).

== Distribution ==
Metridia pacifica is found in the north Pacific and sub-Arctic waters. It can be found north as far as the southern Chukchi Sea. It is reported to be an expatriate in the Arctic Ocean.

== Ecology ==
=== Life cycle and reproduction ===
Metridia pacifica has multiple broods. At Station P, for example, there are three cohorts: one in March, one in late June and July, and one in September to early October. The nauplii are generally found above depths of 500 metres (1,600 ft) (and mostly above 100 metres (330 ft), and their distribution in these surface waters varies seasonally. It is likely that this is influenced by temperature; in one study, over 85% of nauplii were found below the thermocline from 14 June until 22 September, when it is warmer at the surface.

Metridia pacifica has an average generation time of three to four months at Station P.
