= Tagea Björnberg =

Brazilian marine biologist (born 1925)

- Born: 20 September 1925; São Vicente, São Paulo, Brazil
- Died: Between 2021 and 2023
- Education: University of São Paulo (licenciado, PhD)
- Awards: Guggenheim Fellowship (1967)
- Scientific career
- Workplaces: University of Paraná; University of São Paulo

Tagea Kristina Simon Björnberg (20 September 1925 – before 26 June 2023) was a Brazilian marine biologist. A 1967 Guggenheim Fellow, she specialized in plankton and studied them at the Oceanographic Institute of the University of São Paulo.

== Biography ==
Björnberg was born on 20 September 1925 in São Vicente, São Paulo. She was born to a Swedish father and was 1/4 German on her mother's side. While she was 11, she wrote to children's writer Monteiro Lobato suggesting he create a new character in his books; Lobato took up on the offer and inserted her in the Sítio do Picapau Amarelo series as Björnberg de Coqueiros. Her passion for nature inspired her to study biology at the University of São Paulo, where she obtained her licenciado in 1948.

Björnberg originally worked at the University of Paraná as an assistant professor of zoology from 1952 to 1954, when she moved to the University of São Paulo to become a planktonologist at their Oceanographic Institute (IO-USP). She obtained a PhD from USP in 1957.

In 1960, Björnberg became chief oceanographer at IO-USP. In 1966, she stepped down from that position to become an assistant professor of zoology at the Faculty of Philosophy, Languages and Human Sciences, University of São Paulo. She eventually retired from USP.

Björnberg studied copepods, specializing in plankton. She received a grant from the Dutch government in 1963, as well as a 1963–1964 São Paulo Research Foundation grant. In 1967, she was awarded a Guggenheim Fellowship "for a study of the systematics of copepods". She was still naming species into her late-eighties, particularly three Harpacticoida genera in a 2014 article. Two crustacean species were named after her: Oithona bjornbergae and Noodtorthopsyllus tageae.

Following her retirement from USP, Björnberg moved to São Sebastião, São Paulo, and, by March 2021, was still working at the CEBIMar at the age of 96. Her death was announced on 26 June 2023.
