= Coelenteramine =

Names
- Preferred IUPAC name 3-Benzyl-5-(4-hydroxyphenyl)pyrazin-2-amine
- Other names Coelenteramine, 2-Amino-3-benzyl-5-(p-hydroxyphenyl)pyrazine

Identifiers
CAS Number	37156-84-6
3D model (JSmol)	Interactive image
ChemSpider	18979379
PubChem CID	193743
UNII	CE63ZJ743V
CompTox Dashboard (EPA)	DTXSID30958363
- InChI: InChI=1S/C17H15N3O/c18-17-15(10-12-4-2-1-3-5-12)20-16(11-19-17)13-6-8-14(21)9-7-13/h1-9,11,21H,10H2,(H2,18,19) Key: BWNPYAKFDUFNND-UHFFFAOYSA-N
- SMILES: C1=CC=C(C=C1)CC2=NC(=CN=C2N)C3=CC=C(C=C3)O

Properties
Chemical formula	C_{17}H_{15}N_{3}O
Molar mass	277.327 g·mol^{−1}
- Except where otherwise noted, data are given for materials in their standard state (at 25 °C [77 °F], 100 kPa). verify (what is ?) Infobox references

Coelenteramine is a metabolic product of the bioluminescent reactions in organisms that utilize coelenterazine. It was first isolated from Aequorea victoria along with coelenteramide after coelenterates were stimulated to emit light.
