= Gaussia (crustacean) =

Scientific classification
- Kingdom: Animalia
- Phylum: Arthropoda
- Clade: Pancrustacea
- Class: Copepoda
- Order: Calanoida
- Family: Metridinidae
- Genus: Gaussia; Wolfenden, 1905

Type species
- Pleuromma princeps (T. Scott, 1894)

Genus of crustaceans

Gaussia is a genus of copepods. The genus contains bioluminescent species. It is a "characteristic genus of the mesopelagial", occurring at depths of 0–3,000 metres (0–9,843 ft). The genus Gaussia contains the following species:

- Gaussia asymmetrica T. K. S. Björnberg & Campaner, 1988
- Gaussia gadusae Sarkar, 2004
- Gaussia intermedia Defaye, 1998
- Gaussia melanotica Wolfenden, 1905
- Gaussia princeps (T. Scott, 1894) (type species)
- Gaussia sewelli Saraswathy, 1973
