= Metridia longa =

Scientific classification
- Kingdom: Animalia
- Phylum: Arthropoda
- Class: Copepoda
- Order: Calanoida
- Family: Metridinidae
- Genus: Metridia
- Species: M. longa

Binomial name
- Metridia longa (Lubbock, 1854)

Synonyms
- Calanus longus Lubbock, 1854; Metridia armata Boeck, 1864

Species of crustacean

Metridia longa is a copepod found in the Arctic, the north Atlantic, the Pacific, and surrounding waters. The female has an average length of about 4.2 millimetres (0.17 in), and the males have an average length of about 3.5 millimetres (0.14 in).

== Description ==
Metridia longa females have an average length of about 4.2 millimetres (0.17 in), with an average range between about 1.6 millimetres (0.063 in) and 4.5 millimetres (0.18 in). Males are usually smaller, with an average length of around 3.5 millimetres (0.14 in), and a range between about 1.6 and 4 millimetres (0.063 and 0.157 in). M. longa are bioluminescent, emitting light when mechanically, electrically, or chemically disturbed. This light is given through secretions containing luciferase from epidermal glands on the head and abdomen.

== Distribution ==
Metridia longa is found in the sub-Arctic, Arctic, north Atlantic, and the Pacific, along the coast of the Americas and Asia. It has also been recorded in the Antarctic, in the Pacific Antarctic.

== Ecology ==
=== Life history and reproduction ===
At least in Balsfjorden, M. longa breeds from early to mid-May. It uses recently ingested food to complete and release the eggs, but it likely uses stored lipids in oogenesis. It has an average clutch size of about 33 eggs, not accounting for cannibalism. These eggs hatch with about 51% success after their 24-hour incubation period. Stage I through V copepodites then develop during the summer. Stages I through III are usually found below about 130 metres (430 ft) during the day, and generally do not migrate. In Arctic waters, it is typically found closer to the surface. Also, in Balsfjorden, copepodite stages I through III were found to occur mostly in the top 50 metres (160 ft) of the fjord. Copepodite stages IV through to the adult stage are migratory, moving from the deeper waters it inhabits during the day to shallower waters at night to feed. This is hypothesized to be because it could reduce the chance of predation, as predators relying on sight would find it harder to detect their prey in the dark. This is further supported by the fact that it spends more time at the surface during the winter, when the nights are longer. It is likely active during this winter season. It also uses stored lipids to develop its gonads when it is overwintering.

=== Feeding ===
Metridia longa is an omnivorous filter-feeder. It cannibalizes its eggs, with a 2008 study finding it removed 38% of its eggs when food was abundant, until chlorophyll a concentrations reached below 50 milligrams (0.00011 lb) per 1 square metre (11 ft^{2}), when it started to remove an increasing amount of eggs, with a maximum of 85% of eggs removed. It has been suggested that it uses omnivory during the winter to supplement its metabolic needs and its gonad development.
