= Cypridina-luciferin 2-monooxygenase =

Identifiers
- EC no.: 1.13.12.6
- CAS no.: 61969-99-1

Databases
- IntEnz: IntEnz view
- BRENDA: BRENDA entry
- ExPASy: NiceZyme view
- KEGG: KEGG entry
- MetaCyc: metabolic pathway
- PRIAM: profile
- PDB structures: RCSB PDB PDBe PDBsum
- Gene Ontology: AmiGO / QuickGO
Search
- PMC: articles
- PubMed: articles
- NCBI: proteins

Cypridina-luciferin 2-monooxygenase (EC 1.13.12.6) is an enzyme that catalyzes the chemical reaction

vargulin
O_{2}
CO_{2}
oxidized vargulin
+ hν

Thus, the two substrates of this enzyme are vargulin and oxygen. Its products are oxidized vargulin, carbon dioxide, and a photon.

This enzyme belongs to the family of oxidoreductases, specifically those acting on single donors with O_{2} as oxidant and incorporation of two atoms of oxygen into the substrate (oxygenases). The oxygen incorporated need not be derived from O with incorporation of one atom of oxygen (internal monooxygenases o internal mixed-function oxidases). The systematic name of this enzyme class is Cypridina-luciferin:oxygen 2-oxidoreductase (decarboxylating). Other names in common use include Cypridina-type luciferase, luciferase (Cypridina luciferin), and Cypridina luciferase.

The primary sequence was determined by cloning the cDNA.
