= Raphaël Dubois =

French pharmacologist and biologist (1849–1929)

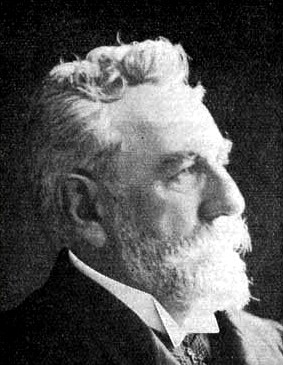
- Raphaël Dubois
- Born: 20 June 1849; Le Mans, French Second Republic
- Died: 21 January 1929 (aged 79); La Seyne-sur-Mer, French Third Republic
- Known for: bioluminescence

Raphaël Horace Dubois (20 June 1849 – 21 January 1929) was a French pharmacologist known for his work on bioluminescence and anesthesia. He coined the terms proteon and bioproteon, from the Greek "proteon" for matter and "bios" for life. Bioproteon means "living matter". He concluded that there was no difference between matter and living matter.

"A consideration of radioactivity led Dubois, in 1904, to the view that the distinction between "matter of life" and "living matter" is superficial. He proposed the term bioproteon meaning the particular state of the "proteon" in living beings, and suggested the desirability of determining the radioactivity proper of the bioproteon. In a subsequent paper he says: "The unique principle of everything, of both force and matter, I have called 'proteon,' and when it pertains to a living being, 'bioproteon'." Proteon and bioproteon are only two different states of the same thing. When the bioproteon is dead it has only ceased to be radioactive and becomes simply proteon."

— C. Stuart Gager, Radiactivity and Life, Torreya A Monthly Journal of Botanical Notes and News, December 1908

Dubois' bioluminescence work began when he became a research assistant to Paul Bert in 1882. While initially planning to study the effects of anesthesia on mollusks, witnessing the bioluminescence of Pyrophorus noctilucus inspired him to study the beetle more in depth. Dubois discovered that not only do the adults glow, but so do the unfertilized eggs, embryo, and larvae. Dubois later conducted studies on Scolioplanes crassipes, wherein Dubois discovered the source of its luminescence is in cells of the wall of the gut. Dubois published a paper studying the light production of Pholas dactylus in 1887, in which he coined the terms luciferin and luciferase.
