= Vargulin =

Names
- IUPAC name 2-[3-[2-[(2S)-butan-2-yl]-6-(1H-indol-3-yl)-3-oxo-7H-imidazo[2, 1-c]pyrazin-8-yl]propyl]guanidine
- Other names: Cypridina luciferin; Cypridinid luciferin; Vargula luciferin

Identifiers
CAS Number	7273-34-9
3D model (JSmol)	Interactive image
ChemSpider	388868
PubChem CID	135398684
UNII	761TM14Y84
CompTox Dashboard (EPA)	DTXSID40331446
- InChI: InChI=1S/C22H27N7O/c1-3-13(2)19-21(30)29-12-18(15-11-26-16-8-5-4-7-14(15)16)27-17(20(29)28-19)9-6-10-25-22(23)24/h4-5,7-8,11-13,26-27H,3,6,9-10H2,1-2H3,(H4,23,24,25) Key: ZWPWSXGBDMGKKS-UHFFFAOYSA-N; InChI=1S/C22H27N7O/c1-3-13(2)19-21(30)29-12-18(15-11-26-16-8-5-4-7-14(15)16)27-17(20(29)28-19)9-6-10-25-22(23)24/h4-5,7-8,11-13,26-27H,3,6,9-10H2,1-2H3,(H4,23,24,25)/t13-/m0/s1 Key: ZWPWSXGBDMGKKS-UHFFFAOYAG
- SMILES: O=C\3N4\C=C(\c2c1ccccc1[nH]c2)N/C(=C4/N=C/3[C@@H](C)CC)CCC/N=C(\N)N

Properties
Chemical formula	C_{22}H_{27}N_{7}O
Molar mass	405.506 g·mol^{−1}
- Except where otherwise noted, data are given for materials in their standard state (at 25 °C [77 °F], 100 kPa). Infobox references

Vargulin, also called Cypridinid luciferin, Cypridina luciferin, or Vargula luciferin, is the luciferin found in the ostracod Cypridina hilgendorfii, also named Vargula hilgendorfii. These bottom dwelling ostracods emit a light stream into water when disturbed presumably to deter predation. Vargulin is also used by the midshipman fish, Porichthys.

== History ==
A partial extraction procedure was developed in 1935 which involved reacting the compound with benzoyl chloride to allow it to be separated from the water-soluble components. The compound was first isolated and purified to crystals by Osamu Shimomura. The structure of the compound was confirmed some years later. Feeding experiments suggest that the compound is synthesized in the animal from three amino-acids: tryptophan, isoleucine, and arginine.

== Biochemistry ==
Vargulin is oxidized by cypridina-luciferin 2-monooxygenase, a 62 kDa enzyme, to produce blue light at 462 nm (max emission, detected with a 425 to 525 nm filter).

vargulin
O_{2}
CO_{2}
oxidized vargulin
+ hν

The vargulin does not cross react with luciferases using coelenterazine or Firefly luciferin.

== Uses ==
Vargulin (with the associated luciferase) has applications in biotechnology:

- in a variety of assays, to report gene or gene expression after luciferase have been genetically introduced in cells,
- to detect ATP, that is used in the vargulin/luciferase reaction (cell viability assays).

Although less stable, the Cypridina system is useful because can be used in multiplex assays with other (red-emitting) luciferin assays.
