= G. princeps =

G. princeps may refer to:

- Grallator princeps, a species in the ichnogenus Grallator
- Gaussia princeps (disambiguation)
- Gynoplistia princeps, a crane fly species in the genus Gynoplistia
