= Renilla-luciferin 2-monooxygenase =

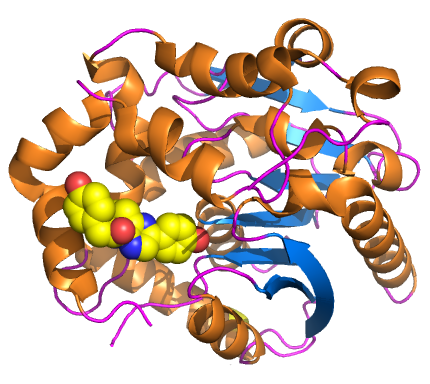
- Renilla reniformis luciferase with bound coelenteramide. PDB: 2PSJ

Identifiers
- EC no.: 1.13.12.5
- CAS no.: 61869-41-8

Databases
- BRENDA: enzyme data
- ExPASy: NiceZyme view
- KEGG: enzyme entry
- MetaCyc: metabolic pathway
- Rhea: reactions
- PDB structures: RCSB PDB PDBe PDBsum
- Gene Ontology: AmiGO / QuickGO
Search
- PMC: articles
- PubMed: articles
- NCBI: proteins

Renilla-luciferin 2-monooxygenase, Renilla luciferase, or RLuc, is a bioluminescent enzyme found in Renilla reniformis, belonging to a group of coelenterazine luciferases. Of this group of enzymes, the luciferase from Renilla reniformis has been the most extensively studied, and due to its bioluminescence requiring only molecular oxygen, has a wide range of applications, with uses as a reporter gene probe in cell culture, in vivo imaging, and various other areas of biological research. Recently, chimeras of RLuc have been developed and demonstrated to be the brightest luminescent proteins to date, and have proved effective in both noninvasive single-cell and whole body imaging.

Note that the EC record also includes other unrelated enzymes that catalyze the same reaction. An example is the calcium-dependent photoprotein aequorin: while Rluc is in the AB hydrolase superfamily, aequorin is an EF hand protein. The name does not specifically refer to Renilla, but instead refers to Renilla-luciferin, a chemical also known as coelenterazine.

== Chemical reaction ==
RLuc is an oxidoreductase, specifically acting on single donors with O_{2} as the oxidant. However, this enzyme appears to be unrelated from most other luciferases that act on coelenterazine, such as those from copepods. RLuc catalyzes the chemical reaction

coelenterazine
O_{2}
CO_{2}
coelenteramide
+ hν

In the process, coelenterazine is oxidized with a concurrent loss of carbon dioxide, and a photon of blue light is emitted.

== Biological function ==
In Renilla reniformis, RLuc is found in membrane-bound intracellular structures within specialized light emitting cells, and is coupled with a closely interacting green fluorescent protein (RrGFP), and a Ca^{++} activated luciferin binding protein (RrLBP). Although the luciferase catalyzed oxidation of coelenterazine releases a photon of blue light (480 nm), this is not observed in vivo. Instead, the energy released by the reaction involving RLuc is passed via resonance energy transfer to the fluorophore of RrGFP and emitted as a green photon (505 nm), resulting in green bioluminescence observed from the animal. This process relies on a Förster resonance energy transfer (FRET) mechanism, increasing the emitted photon number approximately six-fold.

== Structure ==
Renilla luciferase contains 311 amino acids, and is active as a nearly spherical single polypeptide chain monomer of 36 kDa, which have a tendency for self-association, forming inactive dimers and trimers. Like other dehalogenase-superfamily enzymes, it has a characteristic α/β-hydrolase fold sequence at its core and shares the conserved catalytic triad of residues employed by dehalogenases. In RLuc, the loop containing residues 153 – 163 is structurally flexible, facilitating greater diffusion of solvents into the active site, which contains a highly-conserved catalytic triad consisting of Aspartic Acid at residue 120, Glutamic Acid at residue 144, and Histidine at residue 285.

== Enzyme pathway ==
Unlike photoproteins which stably bind coelenterazine and emit light upon addition of calcium, coelenterazine is normally bound by RrLBP, the luciferin-binding protein. When stimulated, a Ca^{2+} ion first interacts with RrLBP, causing it to release coelenterazine. Coelenterazine is then oxidized by RLuc into coelenteramide, releasing a single photon of blue light (480 nm) in the process. This photon is captured by the adjacent GFP, releasing a photon of green light. This pathway is summarized below.

$RrLBP \ce{->[\ce{+Ca^{2+}}]} apoRrLBP(+Ca^{2+}) + coelenterazine$

$coelenterazine + O2 \ce{->[\ce{RLuc}]} coelenteramide + CO2 + hv (480 nm)$

$hv (480 nm) \ce{->[\ce{RrGFP}]} hv (505 nm)$

== Mechanism ==
The RLuc mediated chemical reaction involves the catalytic degradation of coelenterazine, and proceeds through a 1,2-dioxetane (also called dioxetanone or cyclic peroxide) intermediate. Based on studies using radioactively labelled oxygen species within the RLuc complex, it has been determined that the luciferin carbonyl oxygen is exchanged rapidly with oxygen from water prior to incorporation of an oxygen atom from O_{2} via a dioxetane intermediate. The resultant CO_{2} also rapidly exchanges its oxygens with those from the surrounding water. The general mechanism is depicted below.

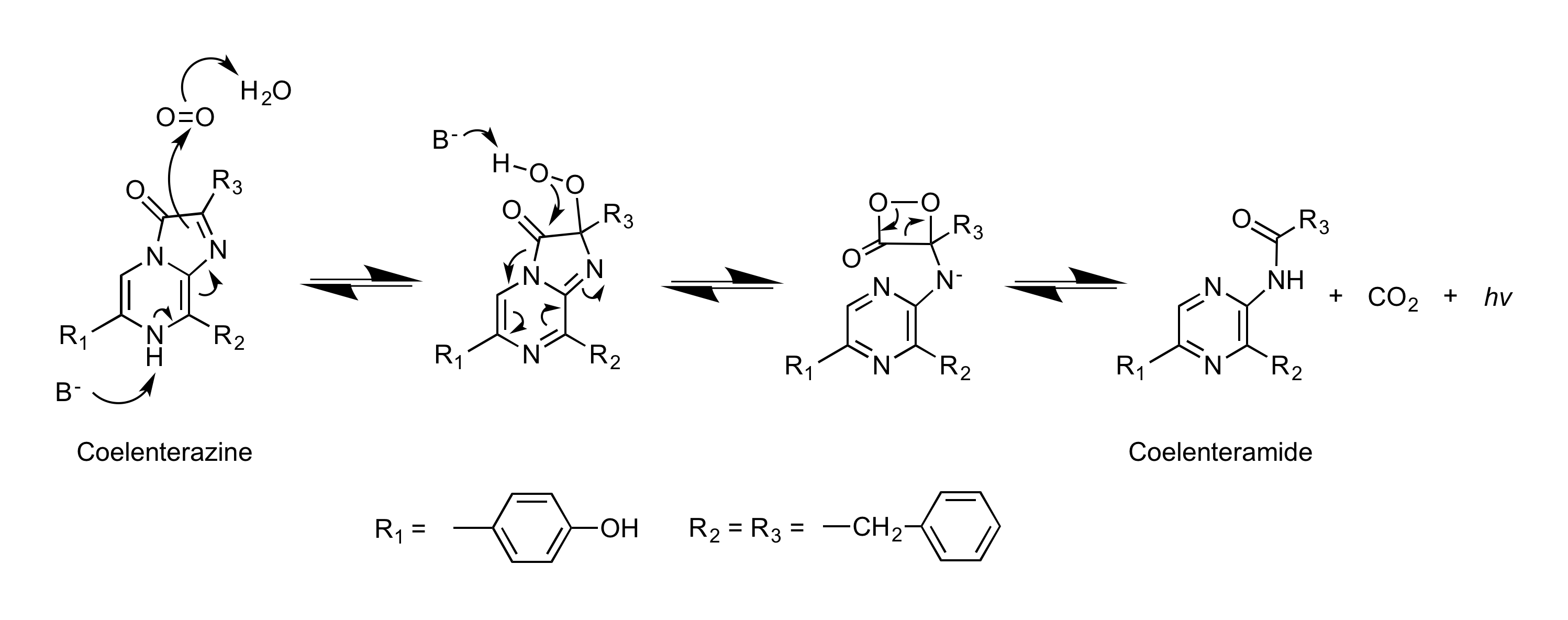
Mechanism of Renilla Luciferase and its conversion of coelenterazine to coelenteramide, CO2 and a photon of light
