= Oceanographic Institute of the University of São Paulo =

Coordinates: 23.5608°S 46.7319°W

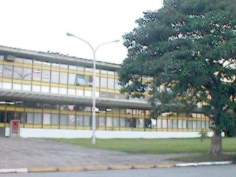
Oceanographic Institute of the University of São Paulo front view.

The Oceanographic Institute of the University of São Paulo (Portuguese: Instituto Oceanográfico da Universidade de São Paulo), or IO-USP, due to its name in Portuguese, was founded in 1946. It began as an independent institute, sponsored by the government, but was later incorporated into the University of São Paulo, in 1951. It was founded to provide scientific research and data in support of fisheries and exploitation of all the available marine resources along the Brazilian coast, especially in the state of São Paulo.

IO-USP was transformed into a University Unit in 1972 and started to offer post-graduate Masters courses in biological and physical oceanography in 1973. It offers an undergraduate course as well and performs many different types of research. Now, the institute has two departments - Biological Oceanography and Physical, Chemical, and Geological Oceanography. The institute has 34 teachers and around 150 general non-teaching workers.

== Research vessels ==
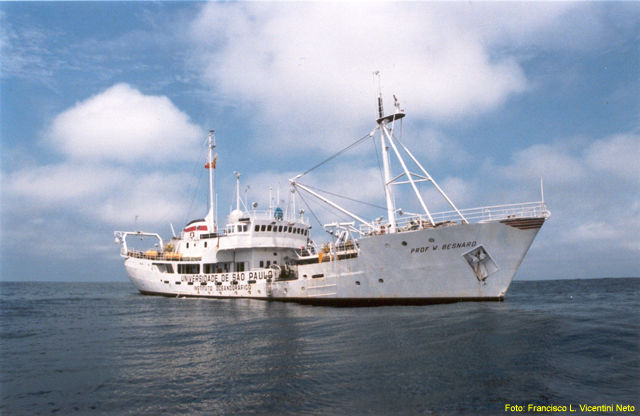
The W. Besnard Oceanographic Ship out in the ocean.

The institution has the support of three major vessels - the W. Besnard Oceanographic Ship, as well as the Albacora and the Veliger, used mostly by the graduation students in their field research.

== Research bases ==
The institute has two research bases - the Dr. João de Paiva Carvalho base, in the estuarine city of Cananéia, and the Clarimundo de Jesus base, in the coastal city of Ubatuba. Both are equipped with advanced laboratories and sufficient research vessels, with the fundamental support of the main vessel, the W. Besnard Oceanographic Ship.
