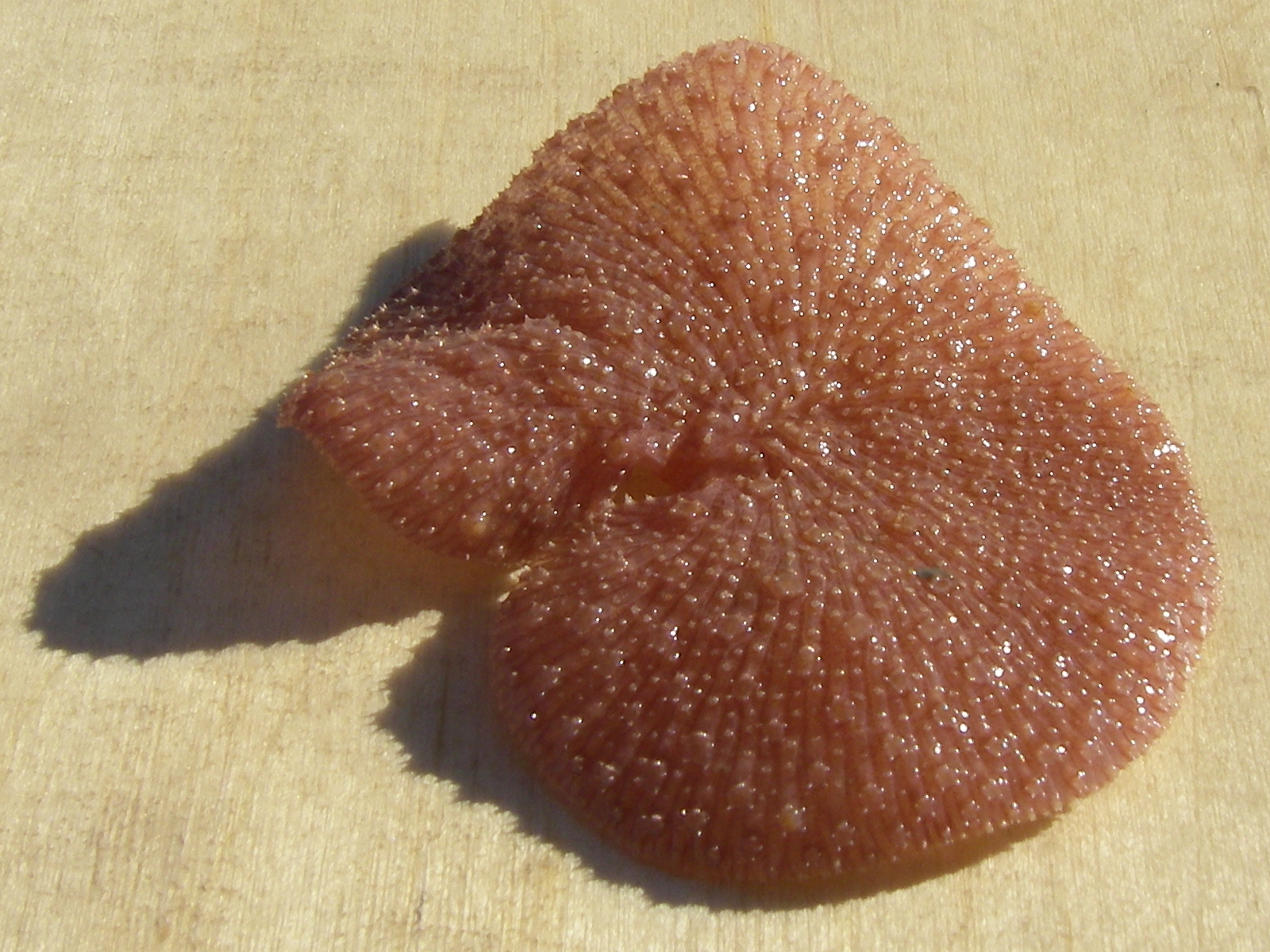

Scientific classification
- Kingdom: Animalia
- Phylum: Cnidaria
- Subphylum: Anthozoa
- Class: Octocorallia
- Order: Scleralcyonacea
- Family: Renillidae
- Genus: Renilla
- Species: R. reniformis

Binomial name
- Renilla reniformis (Pallas, 1766)

= Renilla reniformis =

Species of coral

Renilla reniformis, the sea pansy, is a species of soft coral in the family Renillidae. It is native to warm continental shelf waters of the Western Hemisphere. It is frequently found washed ashore on North East Florida beaches following northeasterly winds or rough surf conditions. It also can often be found living intertidally completely buried in the sand. An important predator is the striped sea slug, Armina tigrina.

== Description ==
The sea pansy is a collection of polyps with different forms and functions. A single, giant polyp up to two inches in diameter forms the anchoring stem (peduncle). This peduncle can be distended to better anchor the colony in the substrate. The pansy-like body bears many small, anemone-like feeding polyps. A cluster of tentacleless polyps form an outlet valve that releases water to deflate the colony. If the colony is on a sand bar at low tide, it usually deflates and becomes covered with a thin film of silty sand. Small white dots between the feeding polyps are polyps that act as pumps to expand the deflated colony. The feeding polyps secrete a sticky mucus to trap tiny organisms suspended in the water. The colony's rigidity and purple color come from calcium carbonate spicules throughout the polyp's tissues.

The sea pansy is strikingly bioluminescent when disturbed because of the interplay between a luciferase (Renilla-luciferin 2-monooxygenase) and green fluorescent protein (GFP). Both molecules have recently become extremely important in biology. It also produces secondary metabolites for chemical defence that may make it an interesting source of marine natural products.

== Genome ==
A draft genome of R. reniformis was sequenced in 2018, producing a haploid genome size of 172 megabases (Mb). This makes it one of the smallest and most compact coral genomes discovered to date.
