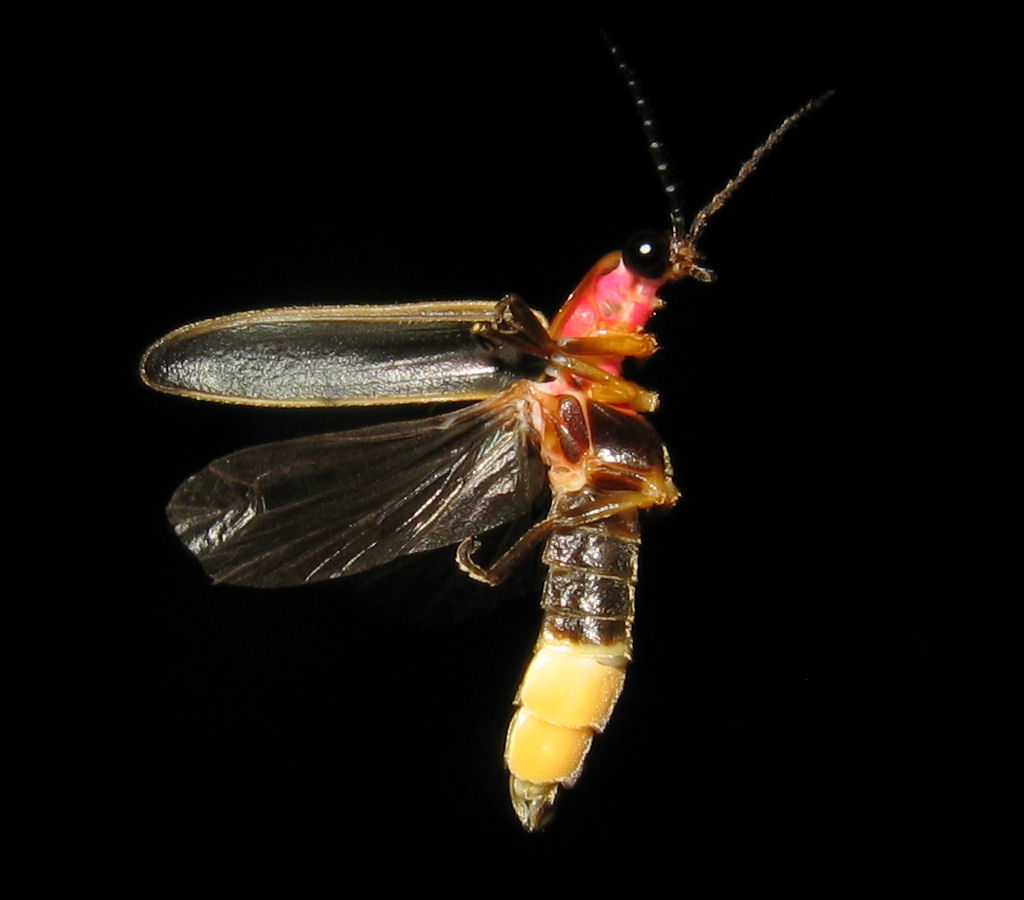

Conservation status
- Least Concern (IUCN 3.1)

Scientific classification
- Kingdom: Animalia
- Phylum: Arthropoda
- Clade: Pancrustacea
- Class: Insecta
- Order: Coleoptera
- Suborder: Polyphaga
- Infraorder: Elateriformia
- Family: Lampyridae
- Tribe: Photinini
- Genus: Photinus
- Species: P. pyralis

Binomial name
- Photinus pyralis (Linnaeus, 1767)

= Photinus pyralis =

Common eastern firefly

Species of beetle

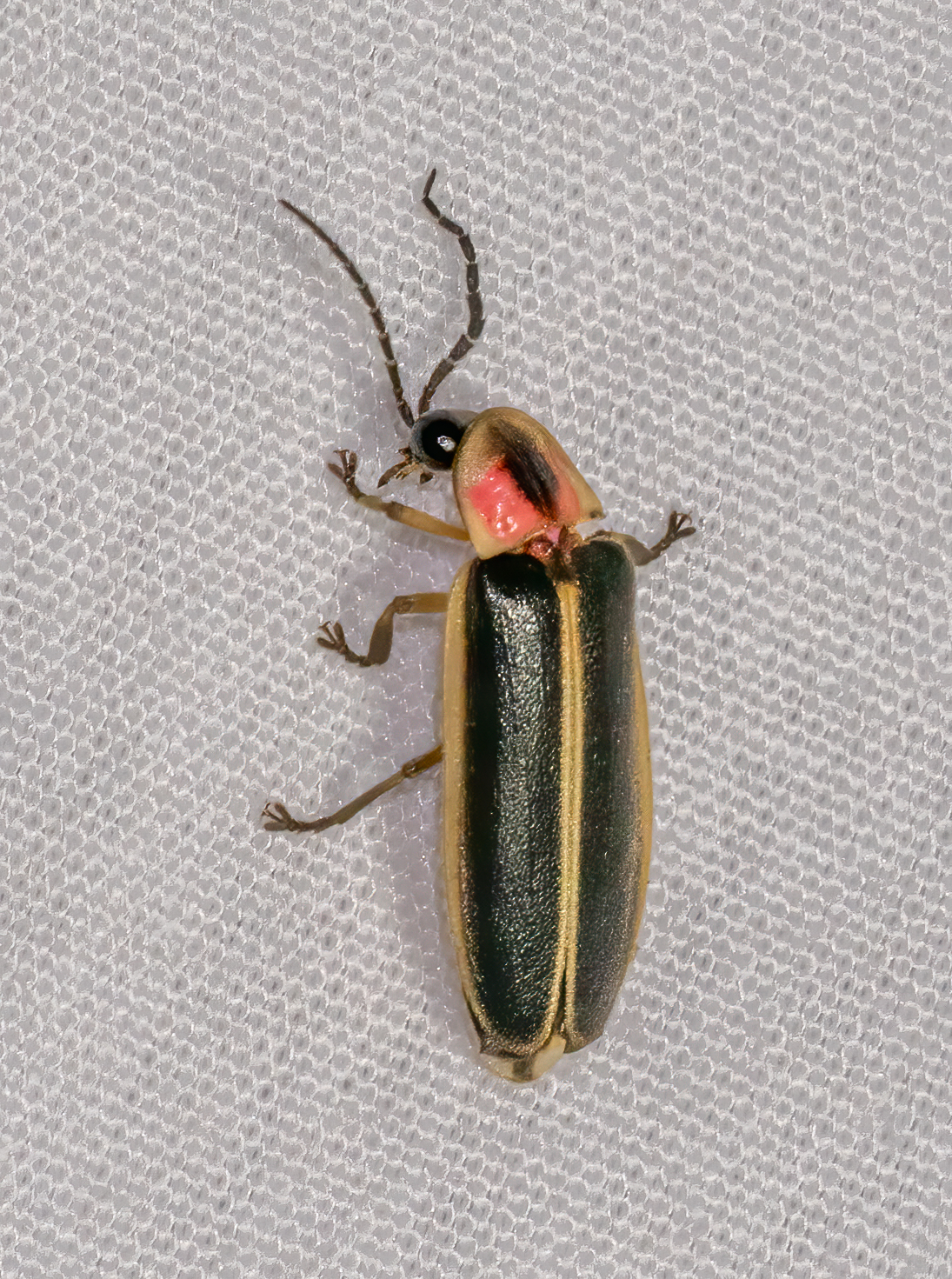
P. pyralis in New York

Photinus pyralis, also known by the common names the common eastern firefly or big dipper firefly, and sometimes called a "lightning bug", is a species of flying beetle. An organ on its abdomen is responsible for its light production. It is the most common species of firefly in North America and is typically found east of the Rocky Mountains. Photinus fireflies are often confused with fireflies of the similar-sounding genus, Photuris, which are also found in North America.

Common eastern firefly (Photinus pyralis)

These fireflies are most noticeable around twilight in the spring and summer months. The common name, big dipper firefly, is due to the characteristic flight of the males, whose trajectory appears to follow a J-shape, lighting on the upswing. During flight, this J-pattern is used alongside light flashing to attract females, who rest on vegetation and signal back to males if interested. The firefly flashes are stimulated by light-activated proteins, not rhythmic impulses as originally thought.

== Description ==
Common Eastern fireflies are small soft-bodied beetles that are 9–19 mm (0.4–0.7 in) long. They have flat black or brown bodies with wing coverings, or elytra, that extend the length of their entire thorax and abdomen. The elytra have a yellow border. The head shield, or pronotum, is pale yellow, with a black dot in the center, surrounded by pink or red.

Both males and females of this species have light-emitting organs on the ventral side of their abdomens. While this organ extends the length of the last three segments of the males' abdomens, it appears only in the second to last segment of the females' abdomens.

Like most flying firefly species, Photinus pyralis is nocturnal.

== Geographic range ==
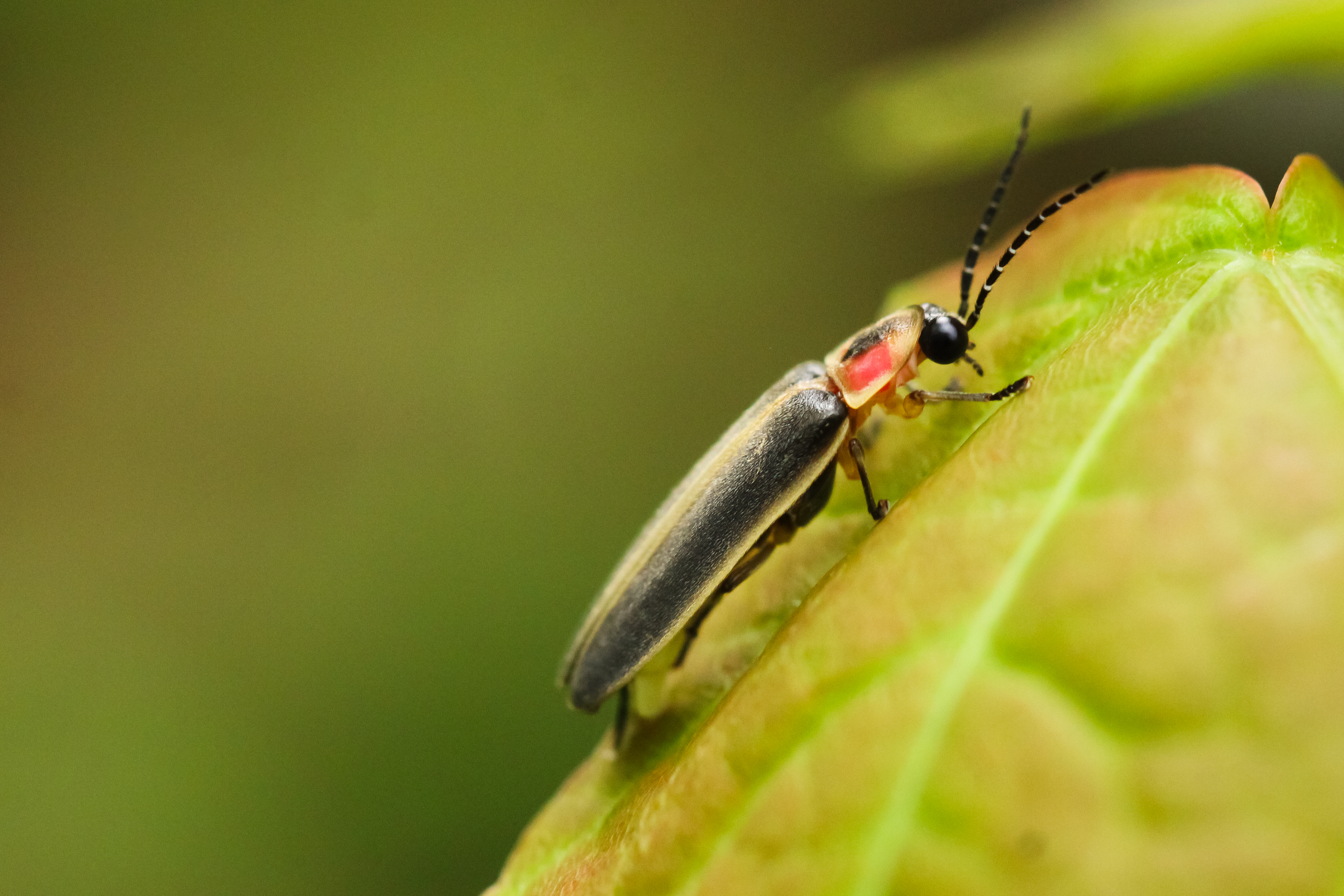
P. pyralis in central Virginia

P. pyralis is widespread across the eastern half of North America.

== Habitat ==
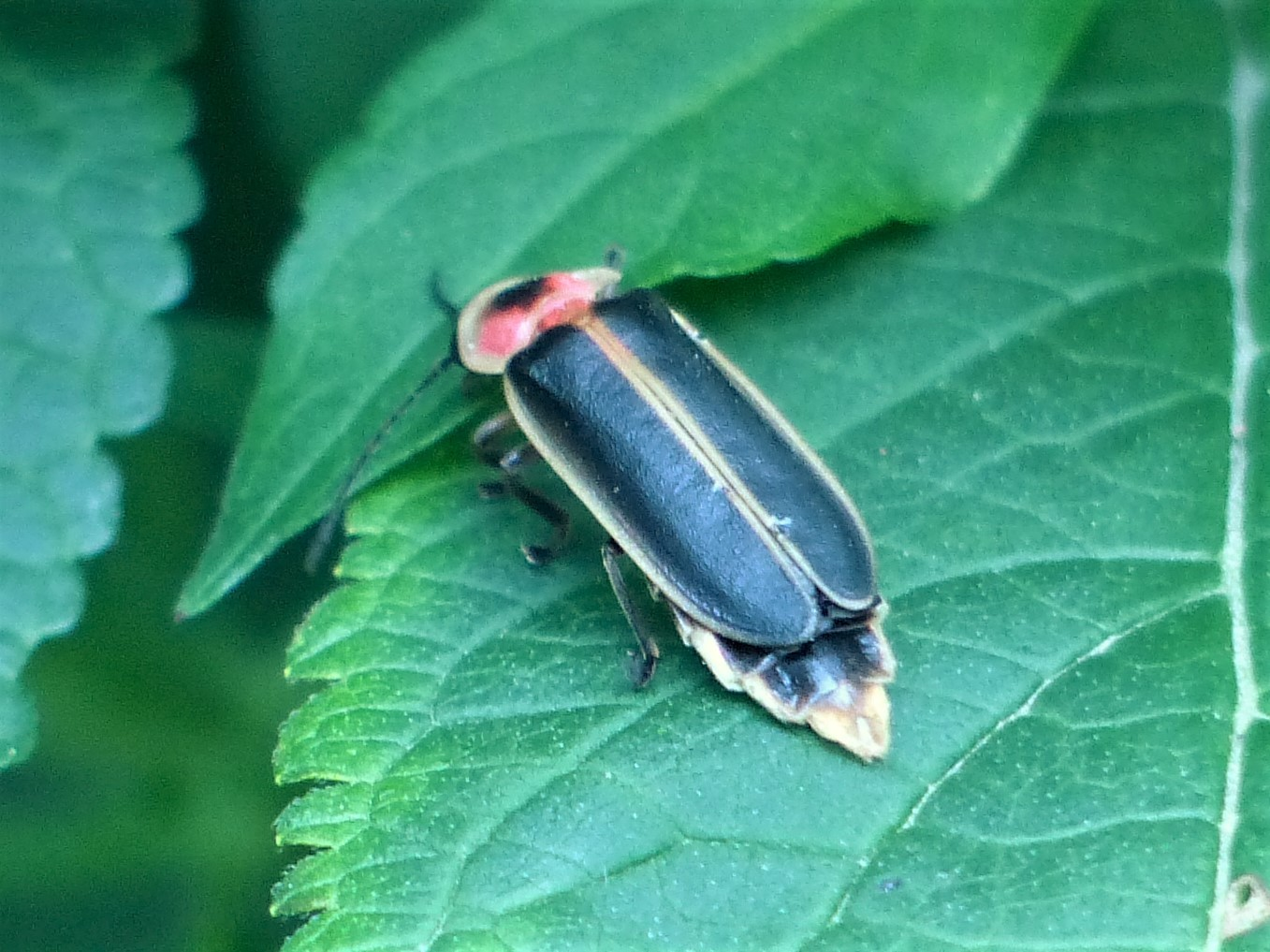

Common Eastern fireflies are found in a variety of habitats, ranging from temperate to tropical environments. Some natural habitats of these fireflies include meadows, fields, wetlands, desert canyons, and dense forests, and while they can successfully thrive in all of these areas, they require moisture to survive at all life stages. They are especially drawn to areas with damp soil and long grasses to better conceal females and offspring.

== Home range and territoriality ==
Population studies have been done to investigate whether P. pyralis has always been endemic to the northeast regions of North America, especially because the species continues to occupy a wide variety of habitats across the continent. It has been discovered that ancestrally, the North American population originated in Texas during the Miocene epoch before migrating to the central states of the US and more recently, the Northeast coast. Through the tracking of single nucleotide polymorphisms (SNPs) along with other genetic markers, researchers have concluded that the common Eastern firefly possibly migrated during interglacial periods, which researchers suggest could account for the divergence to other Photinus species.

== Life cycle ==
Like all beetles, the life cycle of a common Eastern firefly consists of four unique life stages starting with the egg, moving to the larval stage, followed by a pupa, before finally completing the cycle as a fully formed adult.

The time it takes for fireflies to complete all four stages can vary drastically by species, especially because they inhabit such a wide range of environments that the resources available to them vary significantly. However, all fireflies will spend most of their time in their feeding stage as larvae. P. pyralis sometimes takes as long as two years before it pupates. As a larva, P. pyralis lives under the soil and eats worms, slugs, and snails. As it grows, it will experience multiple instars, or molting periods. Because fireflies are very vulnerable during the larval stage, they have evolved to produce light as an aposematic signaling mechanism to drive away predators, regardless of whether or not they continue to be chemiluminescent in adulthood like the common Eastern firefly.

At the end of the larval stage, P. pyralis becomes a pupa. In one to two weeks, it ecloses, or emerges as an adult. After this, the firefly lives for approximately another three weeks to two months, during which time it uses its light to attract a mate.

== Risks ==
Although their conservation status is classified as "Least Concern" by the IUCN Red List, these fireflies do face some dangers. The biggest threats to their populations include light pollution, pesticide use, climate change, and human building and development in their habitats.

== Defense ==
Photinus pyralis contain steroid compounds called lucibufagins, which make them taste bad to potential predators, such as birds, bats, and other insects. However, some species of Photuris fireflies lack lucibufigins, and they prey on P. pyralis males in order to acquire the steroids for themselves. Although the lucibufagins are a defense mechanism for the most part, they can also serve as an attractant to some predators. Beetles from the family Lampyridae have been known to use certain defenses such as unpleasant odour and the excretion of a sticky substance to avoid predation. Excretion of unpleasant fluids containing lucibufagins from the areas along the elytra and pronotum is the result of tactile stimulation and has been referred to as reflexive bleeding. This reflex bleeding is a defensive function of P. pyralis, as it can cause certain predators, such as ants, to become entangled in the sticky substance, or it can cause revulsion in others upon predation. Whereas adult flashing is used in mate signaling, pupae glow is thought to be an aposematic display for nocturnal predators.

== Mating ==
=== Mate-searching behavior ===
Males are the first to start the series of patrolling flashes needed to locate and mate with a female. Males will actively fly while flashing, whereas females are sedentary. Male P. pyralis will flash every 5 to 7 seconds and wait for a responding flash from the female, which comes after a 1 to 2 second delay. The length of time between male flashes is temperature dependent, with shorter intervals as temperature increases. It has been shown that females only respond to their conspecific males, identifying them by the color of their yellow bioluminescent flash, in combination with the temporal patterning, duration and intensity of the male flash. Females will twist their abdomen towards the male's flash, presenting their own flash toward the male. Males can be observed flying in a nearly vertical orientation, their antennae held forward and stiff while their legs are held toward the body during patrolling. They also show an obvious gaze shift towards the last female flash and continue towards it until the female firefly flashes again. The flashes continue until the male reaches the female. Males congregate in large masses and it is likely that more than one will find the same female; in this case male P. pyralis display aggression towards one another while not in flight.

=== Male/male interactions and sexual selection ===
During the "aggression" stage, males with smaller elytra and smaller lanterns are favored, whereas during the signaling phase, males with longer elytra and bigger lanterns are favored. Males with larger lanterns are favored in signaling phases of courtship because their broadcasting flashes can be seen by females who are further away. It is also suggested that due to their longer elytra these males may also have an advantage of finding the females faster.

=== Female/male interactions and sexual selection ===
Among fireflies of the genus Photinus, males will first attract a female's attention with their light flashing patterns, but once they reach the females they will be selected based on the size and quality of the "nuptial gifts" they can offer. These nuptial gifts, also known as spermatophores, are a combination of sperm and high levels of protein, hormones, defensive compounds, and other nutrients which the females will subsequently use to feed the eggs should she choose to mate with the male. During the adult stage of their lives, most Photinus fireflies do not eat, so all activity is fueled by energy that is consumed and subsequently stored during the larval stage; this becomes especially important regarding reproductive activity. Consequently, these nuptial gifts are a big factor in determining which male fireflies females choose to mate with. Although it ends up being a high cost to males, those with larger spermatophores tend to see increased reproductive success because they are able to provide females with more nutrients to sustain future offspring. It was found that females were more likely to mate with virgin males who had never mated because their nuptial gift sizes were larger in comparison to males who had mated the previous night.

==== Polyandry ====
The female common Eastern firefly is polyandrous, meaning it will mate with multiple males over multiple nights, although it will only mate with a single male in one night. This practice has been shown to increase female fecundity as well as overall lifespan.

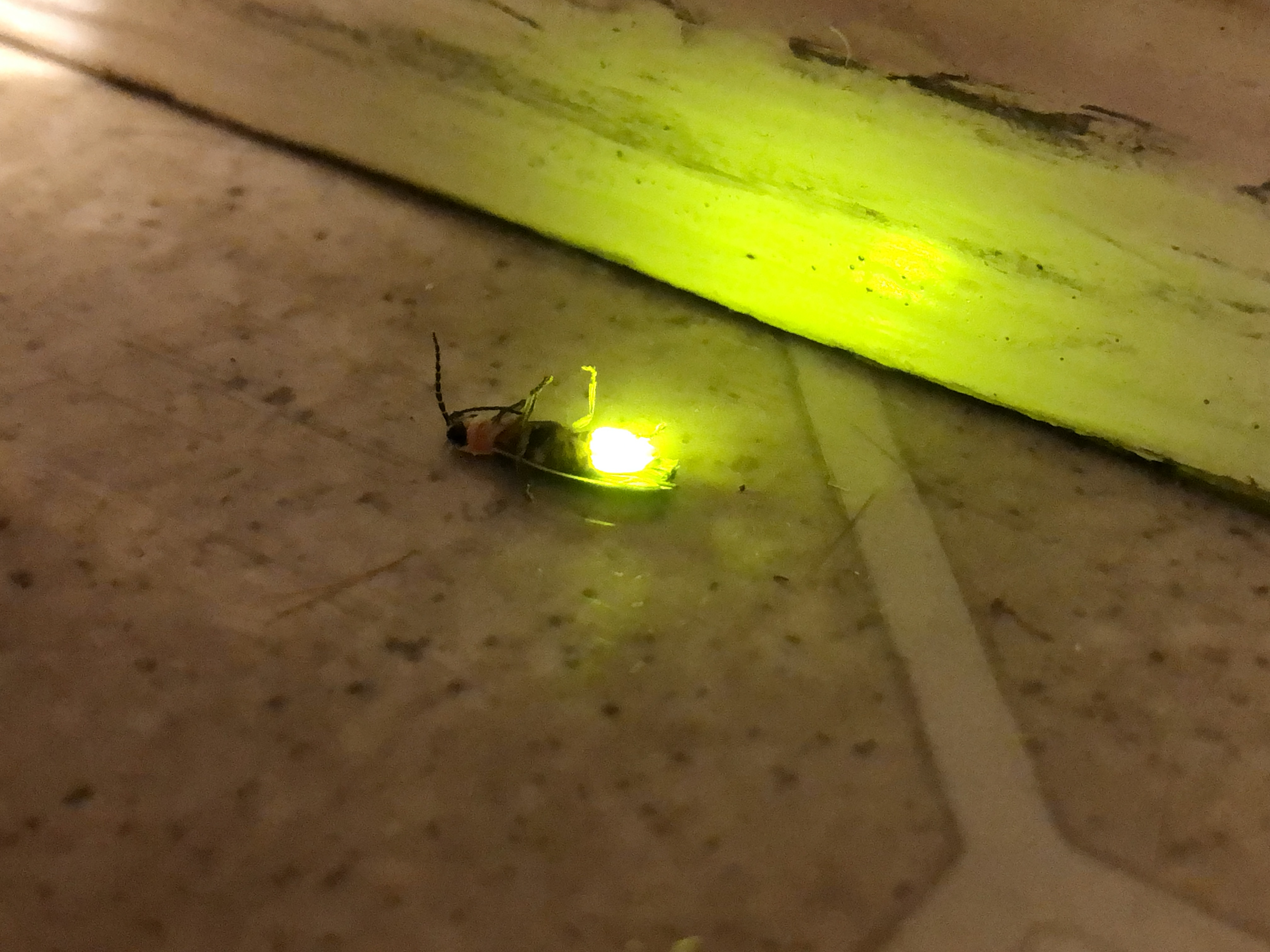

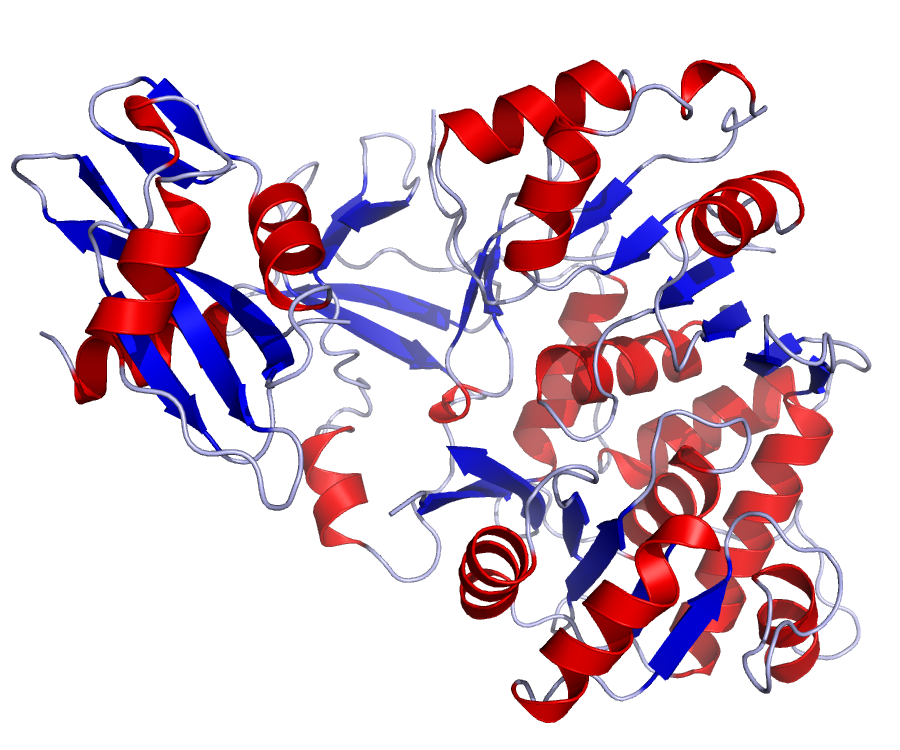
Luciferase Crystal Structure

== Light production ==
The light organ of P. pyralis is composed of two layers: a layer of refractile cells on the dorsal side and a photic layer with light-producing cells on the ventral side. The light organ (specifically the photogenic layer) is supplied with numerous tracheal branches, which are thought to provide the required oxygen for light production. The light-producing enzyme is luciferase, and is found within cells of the lantern. Luciferase requires oxygen, luciferin and adenosine triphosphate (ATP) to catalyze a chemical reaction that produces bioluminescence in these insects. It has been shown that the glow is not controlled by the tracheal end cells (which were thought to contain valves) nor by central nerve impulses through studies involving low oxygen conditions. Pupae of these beetles have different light organs than the adult. They do not have the characteristic tracheal end cells of the flashing adults, and whereas the adults emit bright flashes, pupae emit low intensity glowing.

== Biotechnology research ==
Much research has been done to both determine the mechanism by which fireflies can emit light as well as how that tool can be used advantageously in biotechnological contexts. Luciferase has become a tool for many different research strategies. In 2018 the Photinus pyralis genome sequence was published.

The first use of luciferase was as a reporting marker in many high throughput assays. Because it is known that luciferase is activated by oxygen, luciferin, and ATP, the assays were specifically pertaining to reduction-oxidation reactions that occurred in various organisms. It is a highly sensitive marker and is very easy and efficient to use, so it is very widely used among scientists. Recent studies have shown that the luciferase protein has been found specifically in peroxisomes of many eukaryotes, the organelles responsible for carrying out oxidative reactions and producing hydrogen peroxide as a byproduct that is quickly removed. More research is being done about how this information can be used for further advancement in the field of molecular and cell biology.
