= Gaussia princeps (crustacean) =

Scientific classification
- Domain: Eukaryota
- Kingdom: Animalia
- Phylum: Arthropoda
- Class: Copepoda
- Order: Calanoida
- Family: Metridinidae
- Genus: Gaussia
- Species: G. princeps

Binomial name
- Gaussia princeps (T. Scott, 1894)

Synonyms
- Gaussia scotti (Giesbrecht, 1897); Pleuromma princeps T. Scott, 1894; Pleuromamma princeps (T. Scott, 1894)

Species of crustacean

The black prince copepod (Gaussia princeps) is a mesopelagic copepod found in temperate and tropical waters worldwide. They have been known to display bioluminescence.

Gaussia princeps is used in the production of luciferase.
