= Coelenteramide =

Names
- Preferred IUPAC name N-[3-Benzyl-5-(4-hydroxyphenyl)pyrazin-2-yl]-2-(4-hydroxyphenyl)acetamide
- Other names Coelenteramide

Identifiers
CAS Number	50611-86-4
3D model (JSmol)	Interactive image
ChEBI	CHEBI:41487
ChemSpider	20120243
DrugBank	DB04049
KEGG	C15038
PubChem CID	448487
UNII	S5MSB8RF66
CompTox Dashboard (EPA)	DTXSID10416113
- InChI: InChI=1S/C25H21N3O3/c29-20-10-6-18(7-11-20)15-24(31)28-25-22(14-17-4-2-1-3-5-17)27-23(16-26-25)19-8-12-21(30)13-9-19/h1-13,16,29-30H,14-15H2,(H,26,28,31) Key: CJIIERPDFZUYPI-UHFFFAOYSA-N
- SMILES: C1=CC=C(C=C1)CC2=NC(=CN=C2NC(=O)CC3=CC=C(C=C3)O)C4=CC=C(C=C4)O

Properties
Chemical formula	C_{25}H_{21}N_{3}O_{3}
Molar mass	411.461 g·mol^{−1}
Density	1.26 g/cm^{3}
Absorbance	ε_{332.5} = 15000 M^{−1} cm^{−1} (methanol)
- Except where otherwise noted, data are given for materials in their standard state (at 25 °C [77 °F], 100 kPa). Infobox references

Coelenteramide is the oxidized product, or oxyluciferin, of the bioluminescent reactions in many marine organisms that use coelenterazine. It was first isolated as a blue fluorescent protein from Aequorea victoria after the animals were stimulated to emit light. Under basic conditions, the compound will break down further into coelenteramine and 4-hydroxyphenylacetic acid.

It is an aminopyrazine.

== Biosynthesis ==
Biosynthesis of the precursor coelenterazine in Mnemiopsis leidyi and related comb jellies starts from two molecules of tyrosine and one molecule of phenylalanine. Some researchers believe this comes in the form of a cyclized "Phe-Tyr-Tyr" (FYY) peptide, but as of 2025 the full details of the pathway were not known.

== Bioluminescence ==
Enzymes such as renilla-luciferin 2-monooxygenase are responsible for the bioluminescence observed in the organisms which contain coelenterazine by catalyzing the chemical reaction

coelenterazine
O_{2}
CO_{2}
coelenteramide
+ hν

In the process, coelenterazine is oxidized with a concurrent loss of carbon dioxide, and a photon of blue light is emitted.
