= Photoprotein =

Enzyme produced by bioluminescent organisms

In molecular biology, photoproteins are a type of enzyme produced by bioluminescent organisms. They add to the function of the luciferins whose usual light-producing reaction is catalyzed by the enzyme luciferase.

== History ==
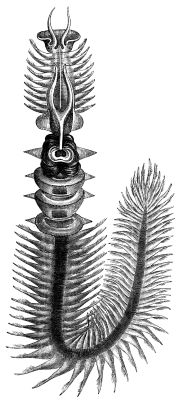
The marine worm Chaetopterus was the source of the first photoprotein to be discovered.

The term photoprotein was first used to describe the unusual chemistry of the luminescent system of Chaetopterus (a marine Polychaete worm). This was meant to distinguish them from other light-producing proteins because these do not exhibit the usual luciferin-luciferase reaction.

== Reaction kinetics ==
Photoproteins do not display typical enzyme kinetics as seen in luciferases. Instead, when mixed with luciferin, they display luminescence proportional to the amount of the photoprotein. For example, the photoprotein aequorin produces a flash of light when luciferin and calcium are added, rather than the prolonged glow that is seen for luciferases when luciferin is added. In this respect, it may appear that photoproteins are not enzymes, when in fact they do catalyze their bioluminescence reactions. This is due to a fast catalytic step, which produces the light, and a slow regeneration step, where the oxyluciferin is freed and another molecule of luciferin is then enabled to bind to the enzyme. Because of the kinetically slow step, each aequorin molecule must "recharge" with another molecule of luciferin before it can emit light again, and this makes it appear as though it is not behaving as a typical enzyme.

Photoproteins form a stable luciferin-photoprotein complex, often until the addition of another required factor such as Ca^{2+} in the case of aequorin.
