= Firefly luciferin =

Chemical compound

Names
- IUPAC name (4S)-2-(6-hydroxy-1,3-benzothiazol-2-yl)-4,5-dihydrothiazole-4-carboxylic acid
- Other names D-(−)-Luciferin, beetle luciferin

Identifiers
CAS Number	2591-17-5
3D model (JSmol)	Interactive image
ChemSpider	4588411; 16735812 One of the other tautomeric representations
ECHA InfoCard	100.018.166
EC Number	219-981-3
PubChem CID	92934
UNII	5TBB02N29K
CompTox Dashboard (EPA)	DTXSID00894865
- InChI: InChI=1S/C11H8N2O3S2/c14-5-1-2-6-8(3-5)18-10(12-6)9-13-7(4-17-9)11(15)16/h1-3,7,14H,4H2,(H,15,16)/t7-/m1/s1 Key: BJGNCJDXODQBOB-SSDOTTSWSA-N; One of the other tautomeric representations: InChI=1S/C11H8N2O3S2/c14-5-1-2-6-8(3-5)18-10(12-6)9-13-7(4-17-9)11(15)16/h1-3,7,13H,4H2,(H,15,16)/b10-9+/t7-/m1/s1; InChI=1S/C11H8N2O3S2/c14-5-1-2-6-8(3-5)18-10(12-6)9-13-7(4-17-9)11(15)16/h1-3,7,14H,4H2,(H,15,16)/t7-/m1/s1
- SMILES: O=C(O)[C@@H]1/N=C(\SC1)c2sc3cc(O)ccc3n2

Properties
Chemical formula	C_{11}H_{8}N_{2}O_{3}S_{2}
Molar mass	280.32 g·mol^{−1}
Appearance	Yellow Powder
UV-vis (λ_{max})	330 nm (neutral and somewhat acidic aqueous solutions)
Absorbance	ε_{330} = 18.2 mM^{−1} cm^{−1}

Hazards
- GHS labelling
Pictograms	(GHS07: Exclamation mark)
Signal word	Warning
Hazard statements	H315, H319, H335
Precautionary statements	P261, P264, P271, P280, P302+P352, P304+P340, P305+P351+P338, P312, P321, P332+P313, P337+P313, P362, P403+P233, P405, P501
- Except where otherwise noted, data are given for materials in their standard state (at 25 °C [77 °F], 100 kPa). Infobox references

Firefly luciferin (also known as beetle luciferin) is the luciferin, precursor of the light-emitting compound, used for the firefly (Lampyridae), railroad worm (Phengodidae), starworm (Rhagophthalmidae), and click-beetle (Pyrophorini) bioluminescent systems. It is the substrate of firefly luciferase (EC 1.13.12.7), which is responsible for the characteristic light emission of many firefly and other insect species in the visible spectra ranging from 530 until 630 nm.

As with other luciferins, oxygen is essential for the luminescence mechanism, which involves the decomposition of a cyclic peroxide to produce excited-state molecules capable of emitting light as they relax to the ground state. Additionally, it has been found that adenosine triphosphate (ATP) and magnesium are required for light emission.

== History ==
Much of the early work on the chemistry of the firefly luminescence was done in the lab of William D. McElroy at Johns Hopkins University. The luciferin was first isolated and purified in 1949 from a large amount of specimens, though it would be several years until a procedure was developed to crystallize the compound in high yield. This, along with the synthesis and structure elucidation, was accomplished by Dr. Emil H. White at the Johns Hopkins University, Department of Chemistry. The procedure was an acid-base extraction, given the carboxylic acid group on the luciferin. The luciferin could be effectively extracted using ethyl acetate at low pH from powder of approximately 15,000 firefly lanterns. The structure was later confirmed by combined use of infrared spectroscopy, UV–vis spectroscopy and synthetic methods to degrade the compound into identifiable fragments.

== Properties ==
Crystal luciferin was found to be fluorescent, absorbing ultraviolet light with a peak at 327 nm and emitting light with a peak at 530 nm. Visible emission occurs upon relaxation of the oxyluciferin from a singlet excited state down to its ground state. Alkaline solutions caused a redshift of the absorption likely due to deprotonation of the hydroxyl group on the benzothiazole, but did not affect the fluorescence emission. It was found that the luciferyl adenylate (the AMP ester of luciferin) spontaneously emits light in solution. Different species of fireflies all use the same luciferin, however the color of the light emitted can differ greatly. The light from Photuris pennsylvanica was measured to be 552 nm (green-yellow) while Pyrophorus plagiophthalamus was measured to emit light at 582 nm (orange) in the ventral organ. Such differences are likely due to pH changes or differences in primary structure of the luciferase. Modification of the firefly luciferin substrate has led to "red-shifted" emissions (up to emission wavelength of 675 nm).

== Biological activity ==
The in vivo synthesis of firefly luciferin is not completely understood. Only the final step of the enzymatic pathway has been studied, which is the condensation reaction of D-cysteine with 2-cyano-6-hydroxybenzothiazole, and is the same reaction used to produce the compound synthetically. This was confirmed by radiolabeling of atoms in the two compounds and by identification of a luciferin-regenerating enzyme.

In firefly, oxidation of luciferins, which is catalyzed by luciferases, yields a peroxy compound 1,2-dioxetanone. The dioxetanone is unstable and via the release of carbon dioxide and excited ketones, which release excess energy by emitting light (bioluminescence).

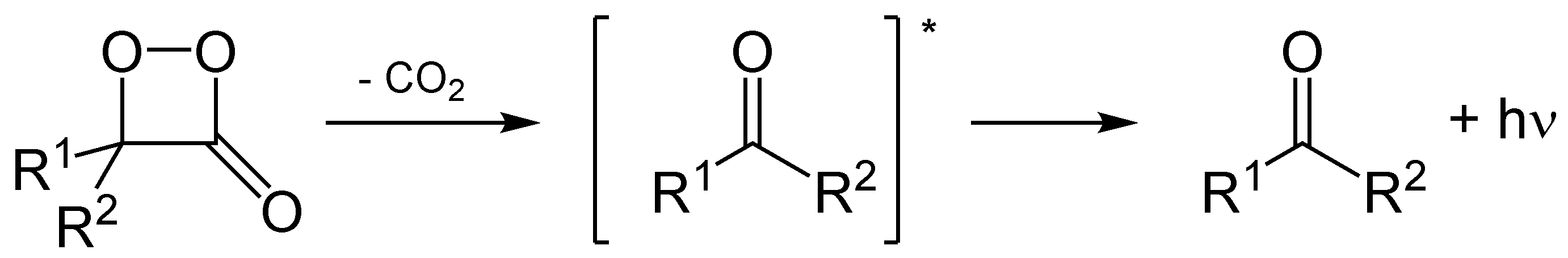
Loss of CO_{2} of a dioxetane, giving rise to an excited ketone, which relaxes by emitting light.

The overall reaction is:

firefly luciferin
O_{2}
CO_{2}
oxidised luciferin
+ photon
of light

Firefly luciferin and modified substrates are fatty acid mimics and have been used to localize fatty acid amide hydrolase (FAAH) in vivo. Firefly luciferin is a substrate of the ABCG2 transporter and has been used as part of a bioluminescence imaging high throughput assay to screen for inhibitors of the transporter.
