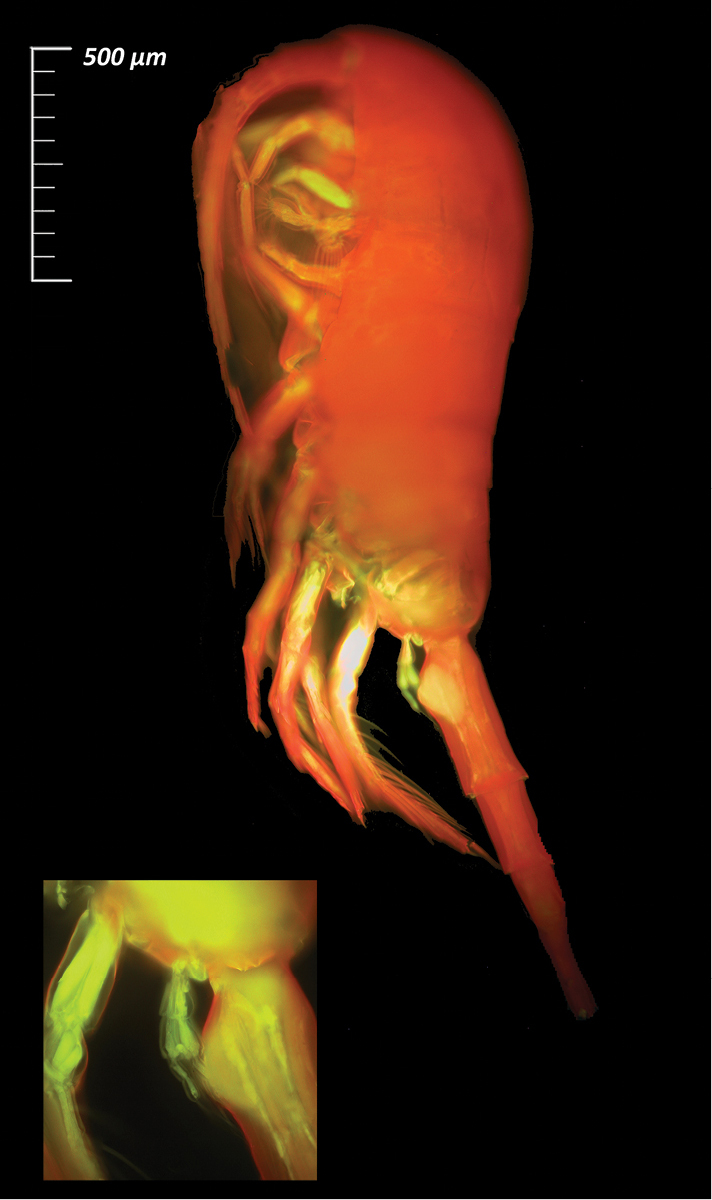
- Metridia gerlachei

Scientific classification
- Kingdom: Animalia
- Phylum: Arthropoda
- Clade: Pancrustacea
- Class: Copepoda
- Order: Calanoida
- Family: Metridinidae; G. O. Sars, 1902

Genera
- Gaussia Wolfenden, 1905; Metridia Boeck, 1865; Pleuromamma Giesbrecht in Giesbrecht & Schmeil, 1898

Synonyms
- Metridiidae Sars, 1902, non Carlgren, 1893

= Metridinidae =

Family of crustaceans

Metridinidae is a family of copepods, comprising three genera – Gaussia, Metridia and Pleuromamma. It has also been referred to as "Metridiidae", but following a petition to the International Commission on Zoological Nomenclature, that name has been restricted to the family Metridiidae Carlgren, 1893, based on the anthozoan genus Metridium. All species in the family can produce blue-green bioluminescence; the light is produced in glands, whose position varies between genera.
