= Circular polarization =

Polarization state

The electric field vectors of a traveling circularly polarized electromagnetic wave. This wave is right-handed/clockwise circularly polarized as defined from the point of view of the source, or left-handed/anti-clockwise circularly polarized if defined from the point of view of the receiver.

In electrodynamics, circular polarization of an electromagnetic wave is a polarization state in which, at each point, the electromagnetic field of the wave has a constant magnitude and is rotating at a constant rate in a plane perpendicular to the direction of the wave.

In electrodynamics, the strength and direction of an electric field is defined by its electric field vector. In the case of a circularly polarized wave, the tip of the electric field vector, at a given point in space, relates to the phase of the light as it travels through time and space. At any instant of time, the electric field vector of the wave indicates a point on a helix oriented along the direction of propagation. A circularly polarized wave can rotate in one of two possible senses: right-handed circular polarization (RHCP) in which the electric field vector rotates in a right-hand sense with respect to the direction of propagation, and left-handed circular polarization (LHCP) in which the vector rotates in a left-hand sense.

Circular polarization is a limiting case of elliptical polarization. The other special case is the easier-to-understand linear polarization. All three terms were coined by Augustin-Jean Fresnel, in a memoir read to the French Academy of Sciences on 9 December 1822. Fresnel had first described the case of circular polarization, without yet naming it, in 1821.

The phenomenon of polarization arises as a consequence of the fact that light behaves as a two-dimensional transverse wave.

Circular polarization occurs when the two orthogonal electric field component vectors are of equal magnitude and are out of phase by exactly 90°, or one-quarter wavelength.

== Characteristics ==
Circularly polarized light (without components) - right handed from point of view of source

Circularly polarized light (with components) - right handed from point of view of source

Circularly polarized light displayed with use of components - showing points of maximum magnitude of vertical component correspond to points of zero magnitude of the horizontal component, and vice versa.

In a circularly polarized electromagnetic wave, the individual electric field vectors, as well as their combined vector, have a constant magnitude, and with changing phase angle. Given that this is a plane wave, each vector represents the magnitude and direction of the electric field for an entire plane that is perpendicular to the optical axis. Specifically, given that this is a circularly polarized plane wave, these vectors indicate that the electric field, from plane to plane, has a constant strength while its direction steadily rotates. Refer to plane wave article to better appreciate this dynamic. Since this is an electromagnetic wave, each electric field vector has a corresponding, but not illustrated, magnetic field vector that is at a right angle to the electric field vector and proportional in magnitude to it. As a result, the magnetic field vectors would trace out a second helix if displayed.

Circular polarization is often encountered in the field of optics and, in this section, the electromagnetic wave will be simply referred to as light.

The nature of circular polarization and its relationship to other polarizations is often understood by thinking of the electric field as being divided into two components that are perpendicular to each other. The vertical component and its corresponding plane are illustrated in blue, while the horizontal component and its corresponding plane are illustrated in green. Notice that the rightward horizontal component leads (occurs before) the vertical component (along the direction of travel) by one quarter of a wavelength, a 90° phase difference. It is this quadrature phase relationship that creates the helix and causes the points of maximum magnitude of the vertical component to correspond with the points of zero magnitude of the horizontal component, and vice versa. The result of this alignment are select vectors, corresponding to the helix, which exactly match the maxima of the vertical and horizontal components.

To appreciate how this quadrature phase shift corresponds to an electric field that rotates while maintaining a constant magnitude, imagine a dot traveling clockwise in a circle. Consider how the vertical and horizontal displacements of the dot, relative to the center of the circle, vary sinusoidally in time and are out of phase by one quarter of a cycle. The displacements are said to be out of phase by one quarter of a cycle because the horizontal maximum displacement (toward the left) is reached one quarter of a cycle before the vertical maximum displacement is reached. Now referring again to the illustration, imagine the center of the circle just described, traveling along the axis from the front to the back. The circling dot will trace out a helix with the displacement toward our viewing left, leading the vertical displacement. Just as the horizontal and vertical displacements of the rotating dot are out of phase by one quarter of a cycle in time, the magnitude of the horizontal and vertical components of the electric field are out of phase by one quarter of a wavelength.

Circularly polarized light (without components) - left handed from point of view of source

Circularly polarized light (with components) - left handed from point of view of source

In the next pair of illustrations, the rightward horizontal component is now lagging (occurs after) the vertical component (along the direction of travel) by one quarter of a wavelength, rather than leading it.

=== Reversal of handedness ===
==== Waveplate ====
To convert circularly polarized light to the other handedness, one can use a half-waveplate. A half-waveplate shifts a given linear component of light one half of a wavelength relative to its orthogonal linear component - meaning the horizontal component which might have been leading the vertical component before entering the half-wave plate would then lag the vertical component on exiting the waveplate (along the direction of travel) - or vice versa.

This manner of handedness reversal for circularly polarized light is not dependent upon any specific 45° or any other angular alignment of incident light with waveplate axes. However, waveplates are wavelength sensitive and the plate thickness is designed for conversion of waves at a particular wavelength.

==== Reflection ====
The handedness of polarized light is reversed reflected off a surface at normal incidence. Upon such reflection, the rotation of the plane of polarization of the reflected light is identical to that of the incident field. However, with propagation now in the opposite direction, the same rotation direction that would be described as "right-handed" for the incident beam, is "left-handed" (keeping the same observation direction) for propagation in the reverse direction, and vice versa. Aside from the reversal of handedness, the ellipticity of polarization is also preserved (except in cases of reflection by a birefringent surface).

Note that this principle only holds strictly for light reflected at normal incidence. For instance, right circularly polarized light reflected from a dielectric surface at grazing incidence (an angle beyond the Brewster angle) will still emerge as right-handed, but elliptically polarized. Light reflected by a metal at non-normal incidence will generally have its ellipticity changed as well. Such situations may be solved by decomposing the incident circular (or other) polarization into components of linear polarization parallel and perpendicular to the plane of incidence, commonly denoted p and s respectively. The reflected components in the p and s linear polarizations are found by applying the Fresnel coefficients of reflection, which are generally different for those two linear polarizations. Only in the special case of normal incidence, where there is no distinction between p and s, are the Fresnel coefficients for the two components identical, leading to the above property.

A 3-slide series of pictures taken with and without a pair of MasterImage 3D circularly polarized movie glasses of some dead European rose chafers (Cetonia aurata) whose shiny green color comes from left-polarized light. Note that, without glasses, both the beetles and their images have shiny color. The right-polarizer removes the color of the beetles but leaves the color of the images. The left-polarizer does the opposite, showing reversal of handedness of the reflected light.

=== Conversion to linear polarization ===
Circularly polarized light can be converted into linearly polarized light by passing it through a quarter-waveplate. Passing linearly polarized light through a quarter-waveplate with its axes at 45° to its polarization axis will convert it to circular polarization. In fact, this is the most common way of producing circular polarization in practice. Note that passing linearly polarized light through a quarter-waveplate at an angle other than 45° will generally produce elliptical polarization.

== Handedness conventions ==
A right-handed/clockwise circularly polarized wave as defined from the point of view of the source. It would be considered left-handed/anti-clockwise circularly polarized if defined from the point of view of the receiver.

A left-handed/anti-clockwise circularly polarized wave as defined from the point of view of the source. It would be considered right-handed/clockwise circularly polarized if defined from the point of view of the receiver.

Circular polarization may be referred to as right-handed or left-handed, and clockwise or anti-clockwise, depending on the direction in which the electric field vector rotates. Unfortunately, two opposing historical conventions exist.

=== From the point of view of the source ===
Using this convention, polarization is defined from the point of view of the source. When using this convention, left- or right-handedness is determined by pointing one's left or right thumb away from the source, in the same direction that the wave is propagating, and matching the curling of one's fingers to the direction of the temporal rotation of the field at a given point in space. When determining if the wave is clockwise or anti-clockwise circularly polarized, one again takes the point of view of the source, and while looking away from the source and in the same direction of the wave's propagation, one observes the direction of the field's temporal rotation.

Using this convention, the electric field vector of a left-handed circularly polarized wave is as follows: $\left( E_x ,\, E_y ,\, E_z \right) \propto \left(\cos \frac{2 \pi}{\lambda} \left(c t - z \right),\, -\sin \frac{2 \pi}{\lambda} \left(c t - z \right),\, 0 \right) .$

As a specific example, refer to the circularly polarized wave in the first animation. Using this convention, that wave is defined as right-handed because when one points one's right thumb in the same direction of the wave's propagation, the fingers of that hand curl in the same direction of the field's temporal rotation. It is considered clockwise circularly polarized because, from the point of view of the source, looking in the same direction of the wave's propagation, the field rotates in the clockwise direction. The second animation is that of left-handed or anti-clockwise light, using this same convention.

This convention is in conformity with the Institute of Electrical and Electronics Engineers (IEEE) standard and, as a result, it is generally used in the engineering community.

Quantum physicists also use this convention of handedness because it is consistent with their convention of handedness for a particle's spin.

Radio astronomers also use this convention in accordance with an International Astronomical Union (IAU) resolution made in 1973.

=== From the point of view of the receiver ===
In this alternative convention, polarization is defined from the point of view of the receiver. Using this convention, left- or right-handedness is determined by pointing one's left or right thumb toward the source, against the direction of propagation, and then matching the curling of one's fingers to the temporal rotation of the field.

When using this convention, in contrast to the other convention, the defined handedness of the wave matches the handedness of the screw type nature of the field in space. Specifically, if one freezes a right-handed wave in time, when one curls the fingers of one's right hand around the helix, the thumb will point in the direction of progression for the helix, given the sense of rotation. Note that, in the context of the nature of all screws and helices, it does not matter in which direction you point your thumb when determining its handedness.

When determining if the wave is clockwise or anti-clockwise circularly polarized, one again takes the point of view of the receiver and, while looking toward the source, against the direction of propagation, one observes the direction of the field's temporal rotation.

Just as in the other convention, right-handedness corresponds to a clockwise rotation, and left-handedness corresponds to an anti-clockwise rotation.

Many optics textbooks use this second convention. It is also used by SPIE as well as the International Union of Pure and Applied Chemistry (IUPAC).

=== Uses of the two conventions ===
As stated earlier, there is significant confusion with regards to these two conventions. As a general rule, the engineering, quantum physics, and radio astronomy communities use the first convention, in which the wave is observed from the point of view of the source. In contrast, many textbooks dealing with optics and chemistry, the second convention is used, in which the light is observed from the point of view of the receiver.

To avoid confusion, it is good practice to specify "as defined from the point of view of the source" or "as defined from the point of view of the receiver" when discussing polarization matters.

The archive of the US Federal Standard 1037C proposes two contradictory conventions of handedness.

Note that the IEEE defines RHCP and LHCP the opposite as those used in optics. The IEEE 1979 Antenna Standard will show RHCP on the South Pole of the Poincaré sphere (Poincaré sphere article shows handedness as per optics convention). The IEEE defines RHCP using the right hand with thumb pointing in the direction of transmit (wave is observed from the point of view of the source), and the fingers showing the direction of rotation of the E field with time. The rationale for the opposite conventions used for optics and chemistry is that observations are usually done from the point of view of the receiver with the incoming wave traveling toward the observer, whereas for most engineers, they are assumed to be standing behind the transmitter watching the wave traveling away from them. This article is not using the IEEE 1979 Antenna Standard and is not using the +t convention typically used in IEEE work.

However, as per more recent standards publication, the IEEE defines the sense of polarisation as:

"the sense of polarization, or handedness ... is called right handed (or left handed) if the direction of rotation is clockwise (or anti-clockwise) for an observer looking in the direction of propagation"

J.D. Kraus (the inventor of the helical antenna) states "The left-handed helix responds to left-circular polarisation, and the right handed helix to right-circular polarisation (IEEE definition)". Thus a right-handed helix radiates a wave which is right-handed, the electric field vector rotating clockwise looking in the direction of propagation.

== FM radio ==
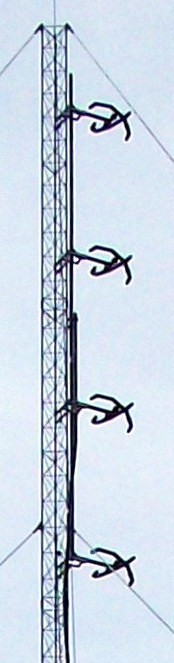
Crossed-dipole antenna array of station KENZ's 94.9 MHz, 48 kW transmitter on Lake Mountain, Utah. It radiates circularly polarized radio waves.

FM broadcast radio stations sometimes employ circular polarization to improve signal penetration into buildings and vehicles. It is one example of what the International Telecommunication Union refers to as "mixed polarization", i.e. radio emissions that include both horizontally- and vertically-polarized components. In the United States, Federal Communications Commission regulations state that horizontal polarization is the standard for FM broadcasting, but that "circular or elliptical polarization may be employed if desired".

== Dichroism ==
Circular dichroism (CD) is the differential absorption of left- and right-handed circularly polarized light. Circular dichroism is the basis of a form of spectroscopy that can be used to determine the optical isomerism and secondary structure of molecules.

In general, this phenomenon will be exhibited in absorption bands of any optically active molecule. As a consequence, circular dichroism is exhibited by most biological molecules, because of the dextrorotary (e.g., some sugars) and levorotary (e.g., some amino acids) molecules they contain. Noteworthy as well is that a secondary structure will also impart a distinct CD to its respective molecules. Therefore, the alpha helix, beta sheet and random coil regions of proteins and the double helix of nucleic acids have CD spectral signatures representative of their structures.

Also, under the right conditions, even non-chiral molecules will exhibit magnetic circular dichroism — that is, circular dichroism induced by a magnetic field.

== Luminescence ==
Circularly polarized luminescence (CPL) can occur when either a luminophore or an ensemble of luminophores is chiral. The extent to which emissions are polarized is quantified in the same way it is for circular dichroism, in terms of the dissymmetry factor, also sometimes referred to as the anisotropy factor. This value is given by:

$$g_{em} \ =\  2\left ( {\theta_\mathrm{left} - \theta_\mathrm{right} \over \theta_\mathrm{left} + \theta_\mathrm{right} } \right )$$

where $\theta_\mathrm{left}$ corresponds to the quantum yield of left-handed circularly polarized light, and $\theta_\mathrm{right}$ to that of right-handed light. The maximum absolute value of g_{em}, corresponding to purely left- or right-handed circular polarization, is therefore 2. Meanwhile, the smallest absolute value that g_{em} can achieve, corresponding to linearly polarized or unpolarized light, is zero.

== Mathematical description ==
The classical sinusoidal plane wave solution of the electromagnetic wave equation for the electric and magnetic fields is:

$$\begin{align}
\mathbf{E} ( \mathbf{r}, t ) &= \left| \,\mathbf{E}\, \right| \mathrm{Re} \left\{ \mathbf{Q} \left|\psi\right\rangle \exp \left[ i \left( kz - \omega t \right) \right] \right\} \\
\mathbf{B} ( \mathbf{r}, t ) &= \dfrac{1}{c} \hat{ \mathbf{z} } \times \mathbf{E} ( \mathbf{r} , t )
\end{align}$$

where k is the wavenumber;

$$\omega = c k$$

is the angular frequency of the wave; $\mathbf{Q} = \left [ \hat{ \mathbf{x}}, \hat{\mathbf{y}} \right ]$ is an orthogonal $2 \times 2$ matrix whose columns span the transverse x-y plane; and $c$ is the speed of light.

Here,

$$\left| \,\mathbf{E}\, \right|$$

is the amplitude of the field, and

$$|\psi\rangle \ \stackrel{\mathrm{def}}{=}\ \begin{pmatrix} \psi_x \\ \psi_y  \end{pmatrix} =  \begin{pmatrix} \cos\theta \exp \left ( i \alpha_x \right )  \\ \sin\theta \exp \left ( i \alpha_y \right )  \end{pmatrix}$$

is the normalized Jones vector in the x-y plane.

If $\alpha_y$ is rotated by $\pi / 2$ radians with respect to $\alpha_x$ and the x amplitude equals the y amplitude, the wave is circularly polarized. The Jones vector is:

$$|\psi\rangle = {1\over \sqrt{2}} \begin{pmatrix} 1  \\ \pm i \end{pmatrix} \exp \left ( i \alpha_x \right )$$

where the plus sign indicates left circular polarization, and the minus sign indicates right circular polarization. In the case of circular polarization, the electric field vector of constant magnitude rotates in the x-y plane.

If basis vectors are defined such that:

$$|\mathrm{R}\rangle \ \stackrel{\mathrm{def}}{=}\  {1\over \sqrt{2}}\begin{pmatrix} 1  \\ -i \end{pmatrix}$$

and:

$$|\mathrm{L}\rangle \ \stackrel{\mathrm{def}}{=}\  {1\over \sqrt{2}}\begin{pmatrix} 1  \\ i \end{pmatrix}$$

then the polarization state can be written in the "R-L basis" as:

$$|\psi\rangle = \psi_\mathrm{R} |\mathrm{R}\rangle + \psi_\mathrm{L} |\mathrm{L}\rangle$$

where:

$$\begin{align}
\psi_\mathrm{R} ~&\stackrel{\mathrm{def}}{=}~ \frac{1}{\sqrt{2}} \left( \cos\theta + i\sin\theta \exp \left( i \delta \right) \right) \exp \left( i \alpha_x \right) \\
\psi_\mathrm{L} ~&\stackrel{\mathrm{def}}{=}~ \frac{1}{\sqrt{2}} \left( \cos\theta - i\sin\theta \exp \left( i \delta \right) \right) \exp \left( i \alpha_x \right)
\end{align}$$

and:

$$\delta= \alpha_y - \alpha_x.$$

== Antennas ==
A number of different types of antenna elements can be used to produce circularly polarized (or nearly so) radiation; following Balanis, one can use dipole elements:

"... two crossed dipoles provide the two orthogonal field components.... If the two dipoles are identical, the field intensity of each along zenith ... would be of the same intensity. Also, if the two dipoles were fed with a 90° degree time-phase difference (phase quadrature), the polarization along zenith would be circular.... One way to obtain the 90° time-phase difference between the two orthogonal field components, radiated respectively by the two dipoles, is by feeding one of the two dipoles with a transmission line which is 1/4 wavelength longer or shorter than that of the other," p.80;

or helical elements:

"To achieve circular polarization [in axial or end-fire mode] ... the circumference C of the helix must be ... with C/wavelength = 1 near optimum, and the spacing about S = wavelength/4," p.571;

or patch elements:

"... circular and elliptical polarizations can be obtained using various feed arrangements or slight modifications made to the elements.... Circular polarization can be obtained if two orthogonal modes are excited with a 90° time-phase difference between them. This can be accomplished by adjusting the physical dimensions of the patch.... For a square patch element, the easiest way to excite ideally circular polarization is to feed the element at two adjacent edges.... The quadrature phase difference is obtained by feeding the element with a 90° power divider," p.859.

== In quantum mechanics ==
In the quantum mechanical view, light is composed of photons. Polarization is a manifestation of the spin angular momentum of light. More specifically, in quantum mechanics, the direction of spin of a photon is tied to the handedness of the circularly polarized light, and the spin of a beam of photons is similar to the spin of a beam of particles, such as electrons. In the physics convention (from the point of view of the source), a right-handed circular polarization corresponds to a positive spin (denoted $\sigma^+$), whereas a left-handed circular polarization corresponds to a negative spin (denoted $\sigma^-$).

== In nature ==
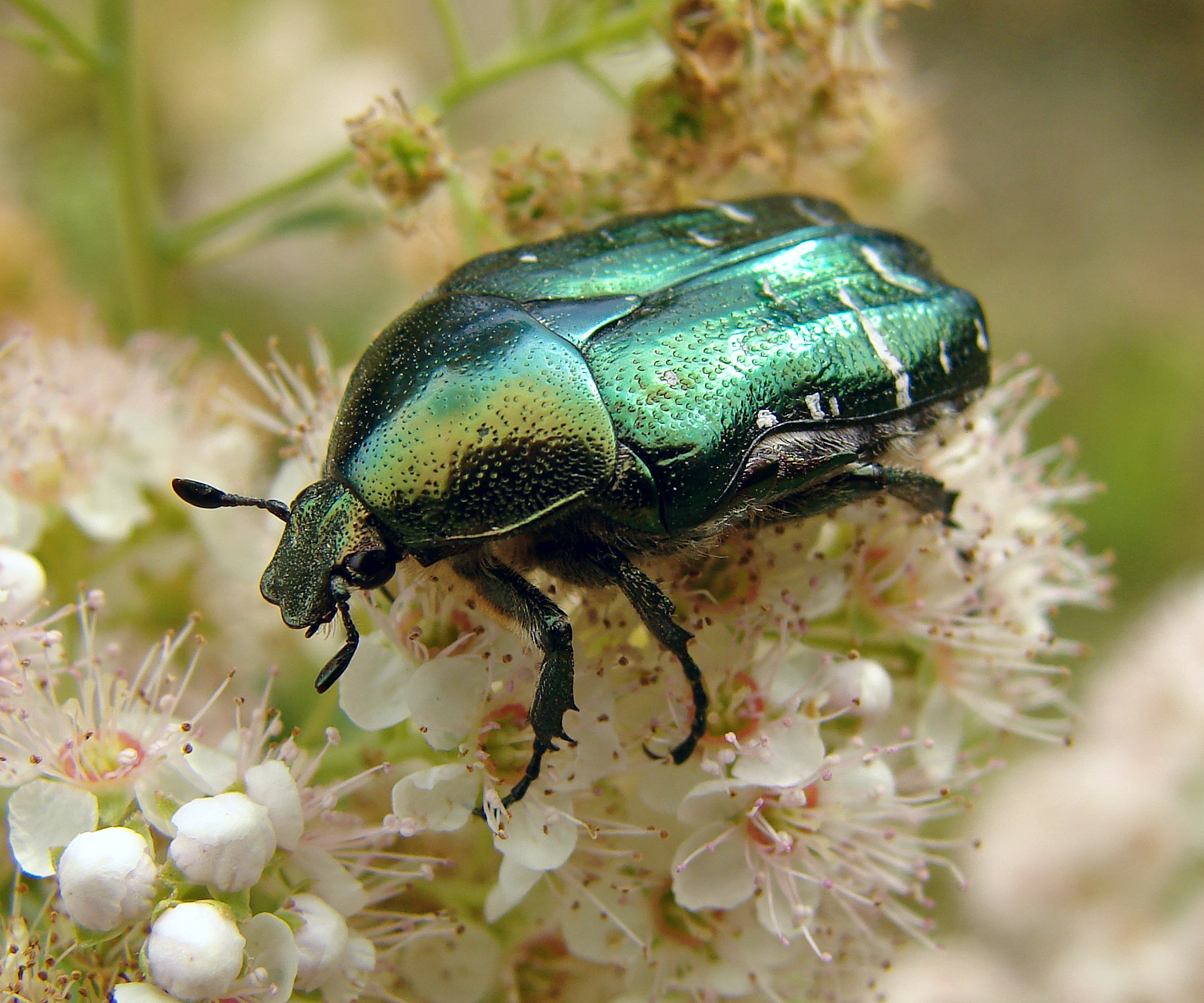
The rose chafer's external surface reflects almost exclusively left-circularly polarized light.

Only a few mechanisms in nature are known to systematically produce circularly polarized light. In 1911, Albert Abraham Michelson discovered that light reflected from the golden scarab beetle Chrysina resplendens is preferentially left-polarized. Since then, circular polarization has been measured in several other scarab beetles such as Chrysina gloriosa, as well as some crustaceans such as the mantis shrimp. In these cases, the underlying mechanism is the molecular-level helicity of the chitinous cuticle. Two species of mantis shrimp have been reported to be able to detect circular polarized light.

The bioluminescence of the larvae of fireflies is also circularly polarized, as reported in 1980 for the species Photuris lucicrescens and Photuris versicolor. For fireflies, it is more difficult to find a microscopic explanation for the polarization, because the left and right lanterns of the larvae were found to emit polarized light of opposite senses. The authors suggest that the light begins with a linear polarization due to inhomogeneities inside aligned photocytes, and it picks up circular polarization while passing through linearly birefringent tissue.

Circular polarization has been detected in light reflected from leaves and photosynthetic microbes.

Water-air interfaces provide another source of circular polarization. Sunlight that gets scattered back up towards the surface is linearly polarized. If this light is then totally internally reflected back down, its vertical component undergoes a phase shift. To an underwater observer looking up, the faint light outside Snell's window therefore is (partially) circularly polarized.

Weaker sources of circular polarization in nature include multiple scattering by linear polarizers, as in the circular polarization of starlight, and selective absorption by circularly dichroic media.

Radio emission from pulsars can be strongly circularly polarized.

== See also ==
- Polarizer
- 3D film
- Chirality
- Sinusoidal plane-wave solutions of the electromagnetic wave equation
- Starlight polarization
- Waveplate
