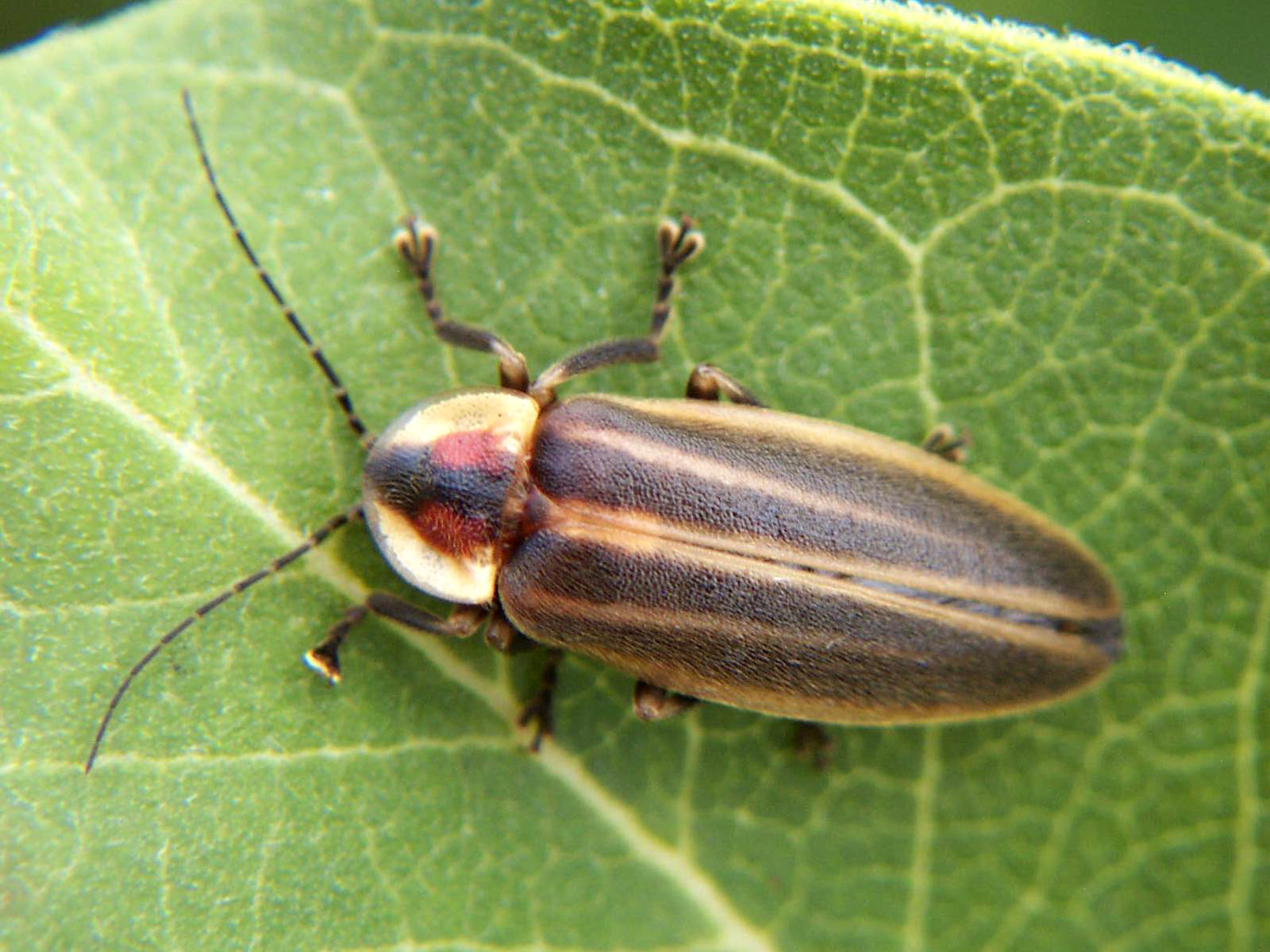
- Adult Photuris lucicrescens

Scientific classification
- Kingdom: Animalia
- Phylum: Arthropoda
- Clade: Pancrustacea
- Class: Insecta
- Order: Coleoptera
- Suborder: Polyphaga
- Infraorder: Elateriformia
- Family: Lampyridae
- Subfamily: Photurinae

Genera
- Bicellonycha Motschulsky, 1853; Photuris Dejean, 1833; Presbyolampis Buck, 1947; Pyrogaster Motschulsky, 1853

= Photurinae =

New World subfamily of fireflies

The Photurinae are a subfamily of the Lampyridae (fireflies). They are among the flashing (as opposed to continuously glowing) fireflies known as "lightning bugs" in North America. The anterior ends of the elytra sit higher than the pronotum, giving the Photurinae a characteristic "hunched" posture.

The Photurinae are sister to the large subfamily Lampyrinae, which contain species that also produce flashing for sexual signaling. It is yet unknown whether the ability to flash in these subfamilies is a homology or a product of convergent evolution.

There are four genera in the Photurinae. The genus Photuris is often called "firefly femmes fatales" and is found in both North and South America, containing many of the well-known North American species such as Photuris pensylvanica, the state insect of Pennsylvania, and the critically endangered Bethany Beach firefly (P. bethaniensis). Bicellonycha is found in Arizona and Mexico, Pyrogaster is found principally in Brazil, and Presbyolampis is found in the Caribbean.
