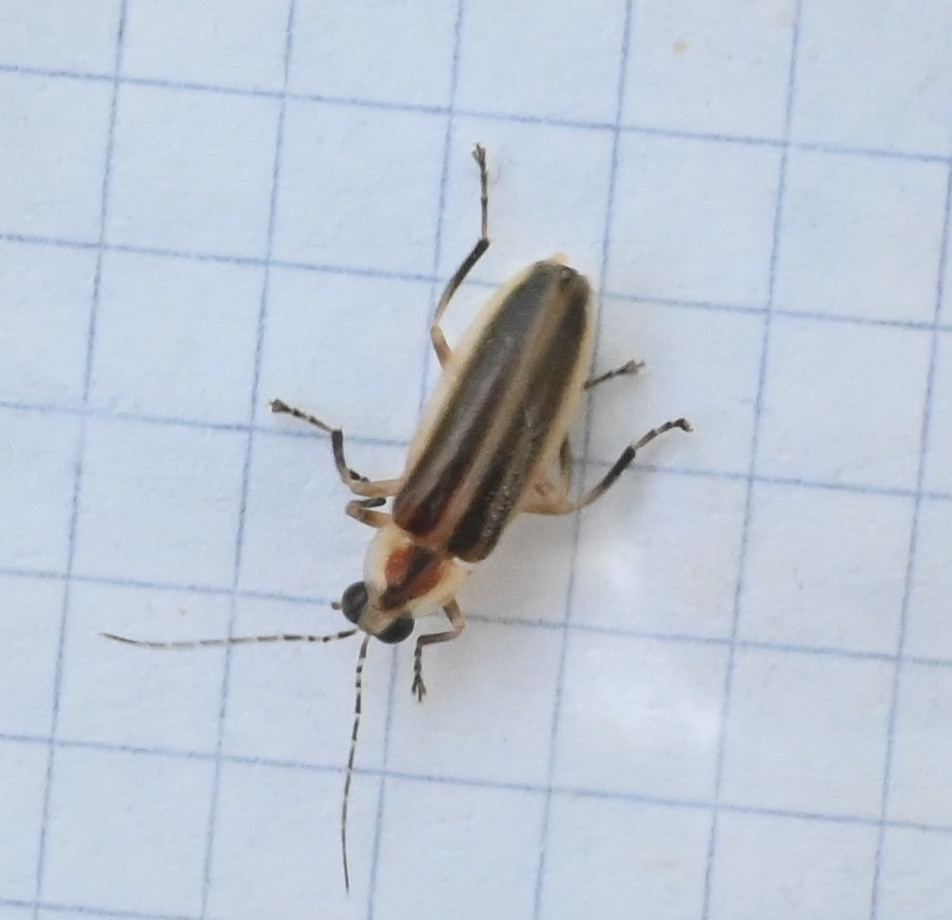

Conservation status
- Least Concern (IUCN 3.1)

Scientific classification
- Kingdom: Animalia
- Phylum: Arthropoda
- Class: Insecta
- Order: Coleoptera
- Suborder: Polyphaga
- Infraorder: Elateriformia
- Family: Lampyridae
- Genus: Photuris
- Species: P. hebes

Binomial name
- Photuris hebes Barber, 1951

= Photuris hebes =

Species of beetle (firefly)

Photuris hebes, commonly known as heebie-jeebies or the slow-hitch firefly, is a species of firefly in the family Lampyridae. It is found in the eastern United States.

== Description ==
P. hebes is a medium-sized firefly, with adults measuring 10–12 mm (0.4–0.5 in) long. It is smaller and narrower than some other Photuris species, such as Photuris lucicrescens. P. hebes have wing covers, or elytra, varying in color from brown to nearly black with light-colored side margins. There is some regional variation in coloring, and depending on the region, they may or may not have shoulder stripes. Coloring on the head shield, or pronotum, also varies. Often the pronotum is yellow, with a dark mark in the center bounded by red or orange. Photuris fireflies have longer legs than species in the other common firefly genus in the United States, Photinus. P. hebes has a pale chest and pale abdominal segments.

== Life Cycle ==
Beetles such as P. hebes go through four life stages: egg, larva, pupa, and adult. Photuris fireflies spend the majority of their lives as larvae, which are bioluminescent. Larvae are predaceous, eating snails, worms, and other soft-bodied invertebrates. Adults appear in mid-summer, from June to July.

== Behavior ==
On summer nights starting about 20 minutes after sunset, adult male P. hebes search for a mate by signaling with quick single flashes repeated about every second, depending on temperature. They flash faster when it is warmer and slower when it is colder. Females respond to the males from the grass and possibly from trees.

== Distribution and habitat ==
P. hebes is found in the eastern United States, as far west as Oklahoma and south to Georgia. They are seen near trees and fencerows that border fields, pastures, streams, and other open areas.
