= Photuris frontalis =

Conservation status
- Least Concern (IUCN 3.1)

Scientific classification
- Kingdom: Animalia
- Phylum: Arthropoda
- Class: Insecta
- Order: Coleoptera
- Suborder: Polyphaga
- Infraorder: Elateriformia
- Family: Lampyridae
- Genus: Photuris
- Species: P. frontalis

Binomial name
- Photuris frontalis LeConte, 1852

Species of beetle

Photuris frontalis is a synchronous-flashing firefly species in the beetle family Lampyridae.

== Geography ==
Photuris frontalis occurs in isolated, distinct sub-populations and is found across much of the Eastern United States. It is locally abundant in some places, particularly within several State and National Parks where its mating displays are a growing tourist attraction. It can be found from cypress wetlands in Florida, to semi-xeric pine-oak-hickory woodlands in Delaware.
