= Chrysina boucardi =

Scientific classification
- Kingdom: Animalia
- Phylum: Arthropoda
- Clade: Pancrustacea
- Class: Insecta
- Order: Coleoptera
- Suborder: Polyphaga
- Infraorder: Scarabaeiformia
- Family: Scarabaeidae
- Genus: Chrysina
- Species: C. boucardi

Binomial name
- Chrysina boucardi (Sallé, 1878)

Species of beetle

Chrysina boucardi is a species of scarab beetle found in Costa Rica.
