= Photuris mysticalampas =

Conservation status
- Endangered (IUCN 3.1)

Scientific classification
- Kingdom: Animalia
- Phylum: Arthropoda
- Clade: Pancrustacea
- Class: Insecta
- Order: Coleoptera
- Suborder: Polyphaga
- Infraorder: Elateriformia
- Family: Lampyridae
- Genus: Photuris
- Species: P. mysticalampas

Binomial name
- Photuris mysticalampas Heckscher, 2013

Species of firefly

Photuris mysticalampas, also called the mysterious lantern firefly, is an endangered synchronous-flashing firefly species described in 2013.

== Distribution ==
It is found in Delaware (in the Prime Hook National Wildlife Refuge) and also the border between Delaware and Maryland (within a 4 kilometres (2.5 mi) radius from the Nanticoke Wildlife Area and also within the area itself), two states within the United States, and it has not been spotted outside of the Delmarva Peninsula. It was once more widespread across Delaware, but it is now restricted to the south of the state. P. mysticalampas is found in inland wetland environments.

== Conservation ==
The biggest threats causing it to become endangered are pollution, climate change and severe weather changes. According to observations by Heckscher (2020), deep peat with sphagnum hummocks and dense vegetation appears to be an important habitat feature for the species, and larvae may be restricted to those areas. In 2023, this species was petitioned to be listed as endangered species under the US Endangered Species Act

== Behaviour and description ==
Photuris mysticalampas has a small, oval shaped body and a densely pubescent elytra. Adults are 8.2–10.55 millimetres (0.323–0.415 in) long, with light brown to grey and striped elytra and (typically) brown thoraxes. It has a distinguishing flash pattern, typically a single yellowish green flash every 3-7 seconds, lasting 0.4 to 0.8 seconds. From mid-June into late-July, adults emerge from sphagnum hammocks soon after dusk and can remain active until past midnight.
