= Photuris fairchildi =

Conservation status
- Least Concern (IUCN 3.1)

Scientific classification
- Kingdom: Animalia
- Phylum: Arthropoda
- Class: Insecta
- Order: Coleoptera
- Suborder: Polyphaga
- Infraorder: Elateriformia
- Family: Lampyridae
- Genus: Photuris
- Species: P. fairchildi

Binomial name
- Photuris fairchildi Barber, 1951

Species of firefly

Photuris fairchildi is a species of firefly in the beetle family Lampyridae. It is found in North America. This species is known to use aggressive mimicry in order to lure in and prey upon the males of other species of fireflies. This species inhabits marshes, spruce forests, and other low-lying swampy areas.
