= Bicellonycha wickershamorum =

Scientific classification
- Domain: Eukaryota
- Kingdom: Animalia
- Phylum: Arthropoda
- Class: Insecta
- Order: Coleoptera
- Suborder: Polyphaga
- Infraorder: Elateriformia
- Family: Lampyridae
- Genus: Bicellonycha
- Species: B. wickershamorum

Binomial name
- Bicellonycha wickershamorum Cicero, 1982

Species of beetle

Bicellonycha wickershamorum is a species of firefly in the beetle family Lampyridae. It is found in North America.

== Subspecies ==
These two subspecies belong to the species Bicellonycha wickershamorum:

- Bicellonycha wickershamorum piceum Cicero, 1982
- Bicellonycha wickershamorum wickershamorum Cicero, 1982
