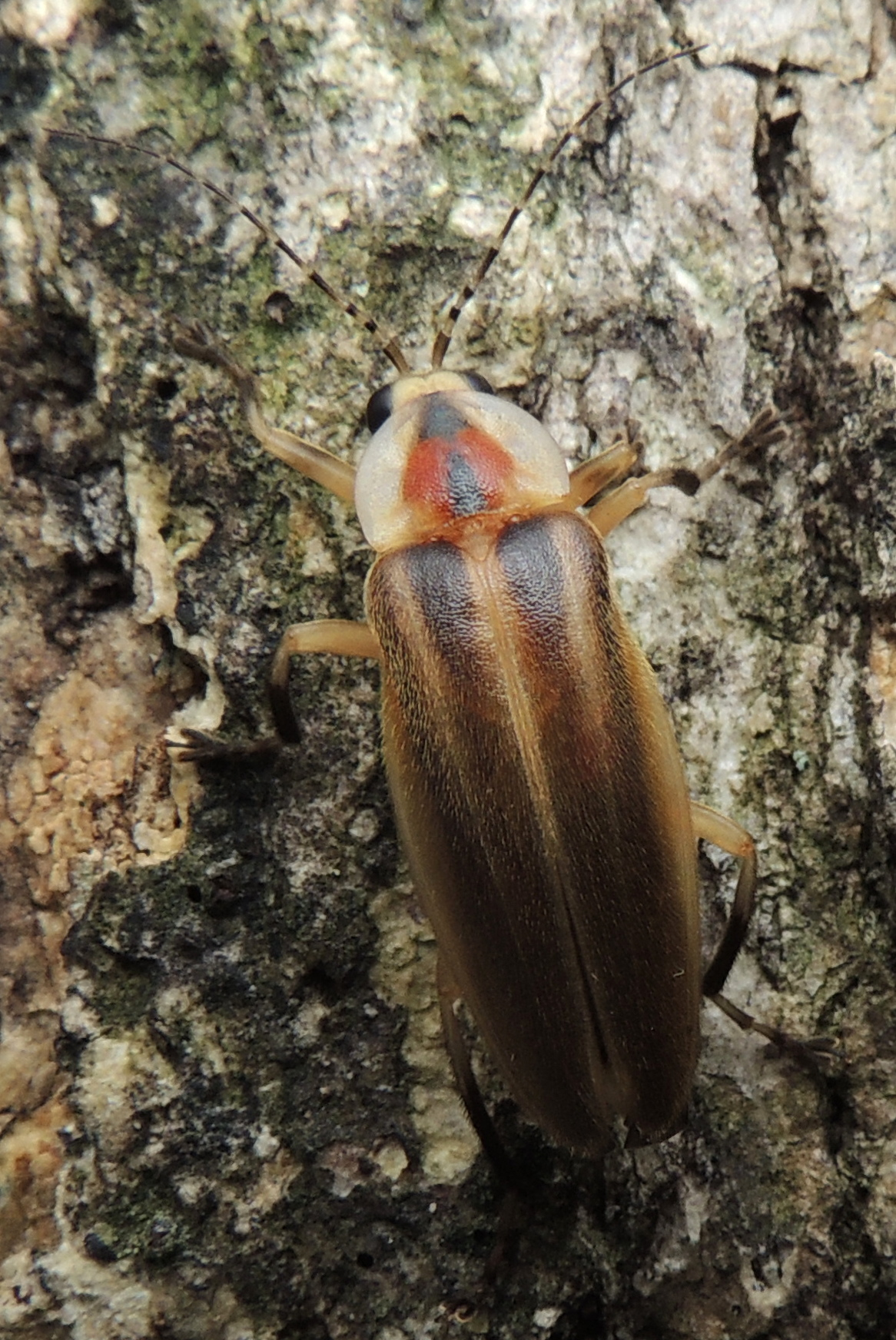
- Photuris pensylvanica

Conservation status
- Vulnerable (IUCN 3.1)

Scientific classification
- Kingdom: Animalia
- Phylum: Arthropoda
- Clade: Pancrustacea
- Class: Insecta
- Order: Coleoptera
- Suborder: Polyphaga
- Infraorder: Elateriformia
- Family: Lampyridae
- Genus: Photuris
- Species: P. pensylvanica

Binomial name
- Photuris pensylvanica De Geer, 1774

Synonyms
- Photuris pennsylvanica Photuris pensylvanicus Photuris pennsylvanicus

= Photuris pensylvanica =

Pennsylvania firefly

Species of beetle

Photuris pensylvanica, known by the common names Pennsylvania firefly, lightning bug, dot-dash firefly and (in its larval state) glowworm, is a species of firefly from the United States. It is also widely known under the Latin name Photuris pennsylvanica, although the original spelling, with one "n", was common in Latinized names of the time and remains the valid name.

== Description ==
P. pensylvanica is a somewhat flattened beetle 8 millimeters to 11 millimeters in length. Its primary color is black, but it has two bright red eyespots on its thorax, as well as yellow edging on its thorax and wing cases and usually a lengthwise yellow stripe partway down the center of each of the latter. The species is carnivorous, feeding mostly on insects but also on other invertebrates, such as land snails and earthworms. The terminal segments of its abdomen are white-yellow and glow greenish-yellow when the insect manifests its bioluminescence. The females of this species, like those of other members of the genus, lure males of other species by imitating their flash patterns in order to prey on them.

This species is often confused with others of the Photuris versicolor complex, and can be distinguished by the dot-dash flash pattern, shorter-than average antennae, and smaller stature.

== Geographic range ==
P. pensylvanica resides in tidal wetlands in Delaware and Maryland. It has been previously reported in Pennsylvania, New York, New Jersey, and the District of Columbia: as far south as North Carolina and as far west as Tennessee. Reports of the species from Canada are likely erroneous.

== State insect ==
In 1974, P. pensylvanica was designated the state insect of Pennsylvania. Its designation as such started with a group of Highland Park Elementary School students in Upper Darby Township, Pennsylvania. Fireflies are abundant in Pennsylvania and are enjoyed for their ability to "transform a midsummer night into a fairyland of tiny, brilliant twinkling lights" Discovering that there was a species of firefly named after their state and that no other U.S. state had adopted a firefly as its state insect, the students began their campaign to have P. pensylvanica made Pennsylvania's state insect.

With advice and support from state legislators, the students began a campaign that included letter writing, the circulation of petitions, and the distribution of bumper stickers. On April 10, 1974, Governor Milton J. Shapp signed Act 59 into law, making the Pennsylvania firefly their state's official insect. A few years later, Highland Park Elementary School was presented with a bronze plaque in honor of the students' achievement.

In 1988, the legislature again confirmed the Pennsylvania firefly's official status and specified it by scientific name. The amended act reads:

Section 1. The firefly (Lampyridae Coleoptera) of the species Photuris pensylvanica De Geer is hereby selected, designated and adopted as the official insect of the Commonwealth of Pennsylvania.

(1 amended Dec. 5, 1988, P.L.1101, No.130)

The firefly is also the state insect of Tennessee, but in this case the specific species referred to (if any) may be Photinus pyralis, the most common species of firefly in North America.

== See also ==
- List of U.S. state insects
