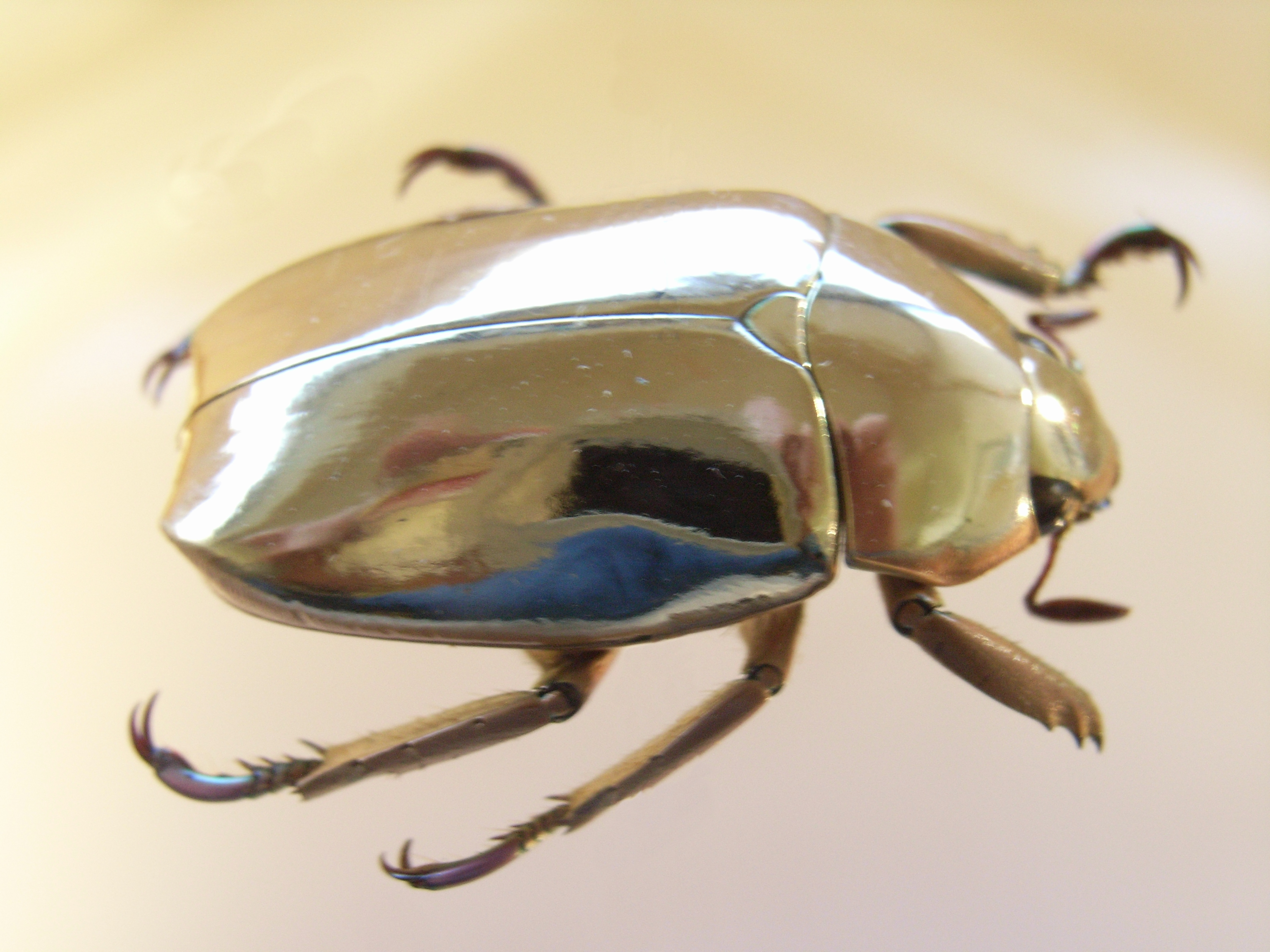
- Chrysina limbata

Scientific classification
- Kingdom: Animalia
- Phylum: Arthropoda
- Class: Insecta
- Order: Coleoptera
- Suborder: Polyphaga
- Infraorder: Scarabaeiformia
- Family: Scarabaeidae
- Tribe: Rutelini
- Genus: Chrysina; Kirby, 1828

Species
- see text

Synonyms
- Plusiotis Burmeister, 1844; Pelidnotopsis Ohaus, 1915; Plusiotina Casey, 1915

= Jewel scarab =

Jewel scarabs

Genus of beetles

Chrysina, or jewel scarabs (not to be confused with jewel beetles, which are a different family), is a genus of brightly colored, often metallic iridescent species of ruteline beetles. They range from the southwestern edge of the United States, through Mexico and Central America, and as far south as Colombia and Ecuador. Chrysina contains more than 120 species, and includes all those formerly in the genus Plusiotis. The genus name is from Greek χρύσινος (chrysinos), "gold-coloured".

== Distribution and habitat ==
Although the genus is wide-ranging, each species tends to be quite restricted in both habitat and distribution, with the vast majority only found in a single or two countries.

Most species are from Mexico and Central America. The highest diversity is in Mexico and Panama, each being home to more than sixty species; Costa Rica, Guatemala and Honduras also have many species, whereas Belize, El Salvador and Nicaragua each only are known to house one or two species. There are only three species in South America where restricted to western Colombia and western Ecuador, and four species in the United States where restricted to highlands of Arizona, New Mexico and western Texas.

They tend to be found in pine, juniper or pine-oak forests, or in cloud forests, most commonly between 1,000–3,000 m (3,300–9,800 ft) elevation, but there are also species found up to 3,800 m (12,500 ft) or in lowlands.

== Behavior ==
The immature stages of most species are unknown, but where known the larvae live in and feed on rotting wood, while the adult beetles feed on foliage. They are harmless to humans and not regarded as pests. The adult beetles are attracted to light during the night.

== Appearance ==
These beetles are typically between 15–35 mm (0.6–1.4 in) in length. The majority of species have bright shiny green upperparts, but metallic silver and gold are also common colors (species with all-silver or all-golden upperparts only occur in Central and South America), and a few can be metallic reddish. Some species combine the colors, like the green-and-silver striped C. gloriosa.

They are very popular among collectors; many species are polymorphic. While their value often is quite low, only a few US$, particularly attractive specimens were reported to sell for as much as US$500 in 2007.

=== Metallic color mechanism ===
Research has shown that the elytra of Chrysina are composed of about 70 chitinous layers of exoskeleton. The different reflective indices and spacing of the layers cause light of different wavelengths to be selectively refracted through them and by them in different phases, leading to a metallic appearance, and also leads to different specimens having different colors.

== Species ==
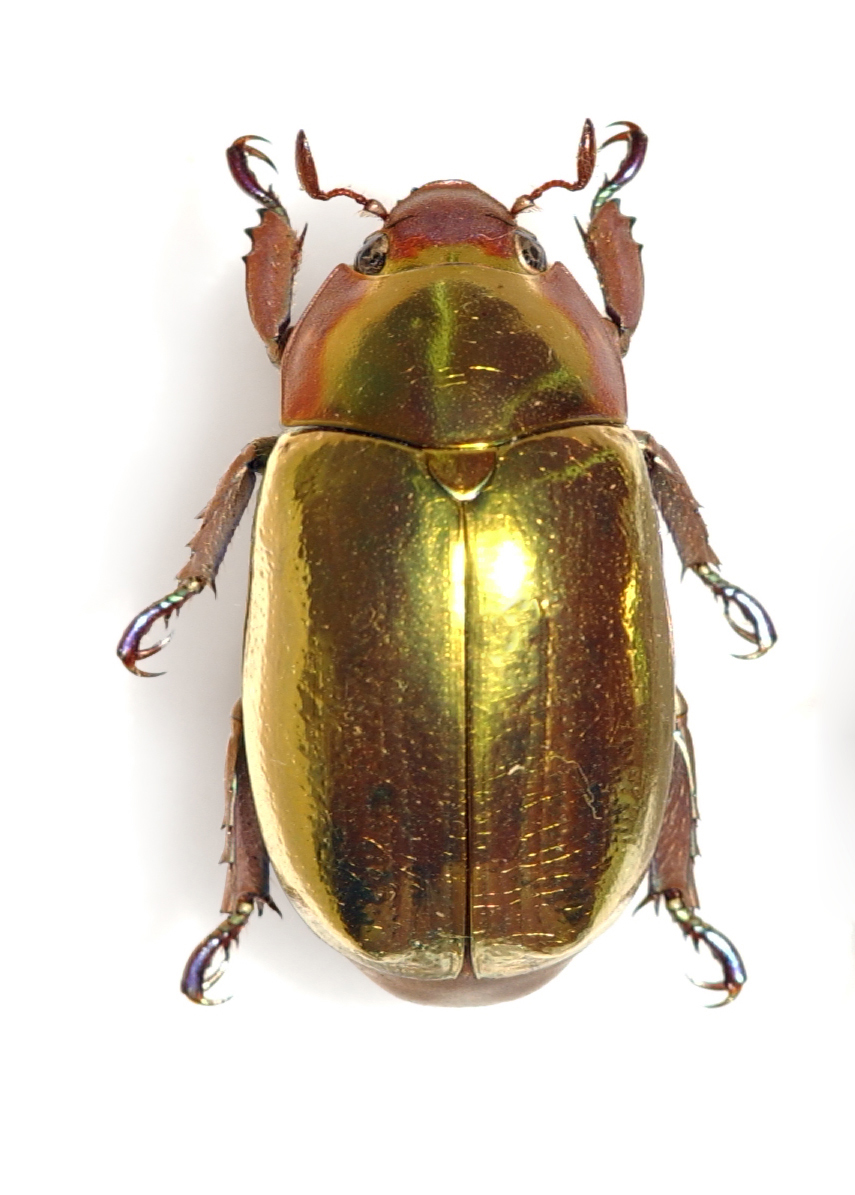
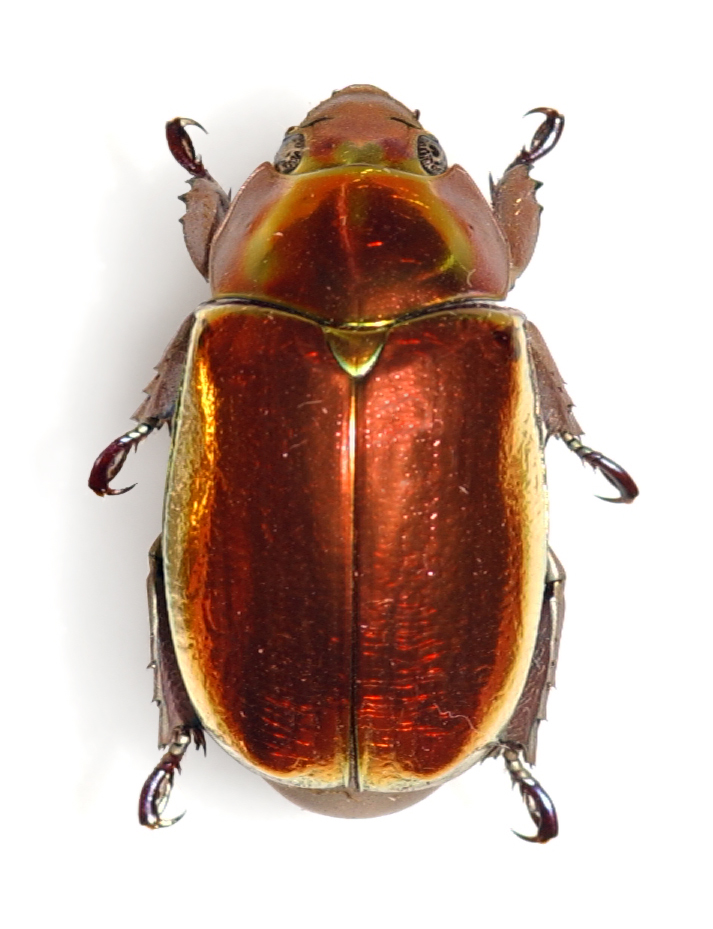
C. aurigans typically is golden, but can also be metallic red

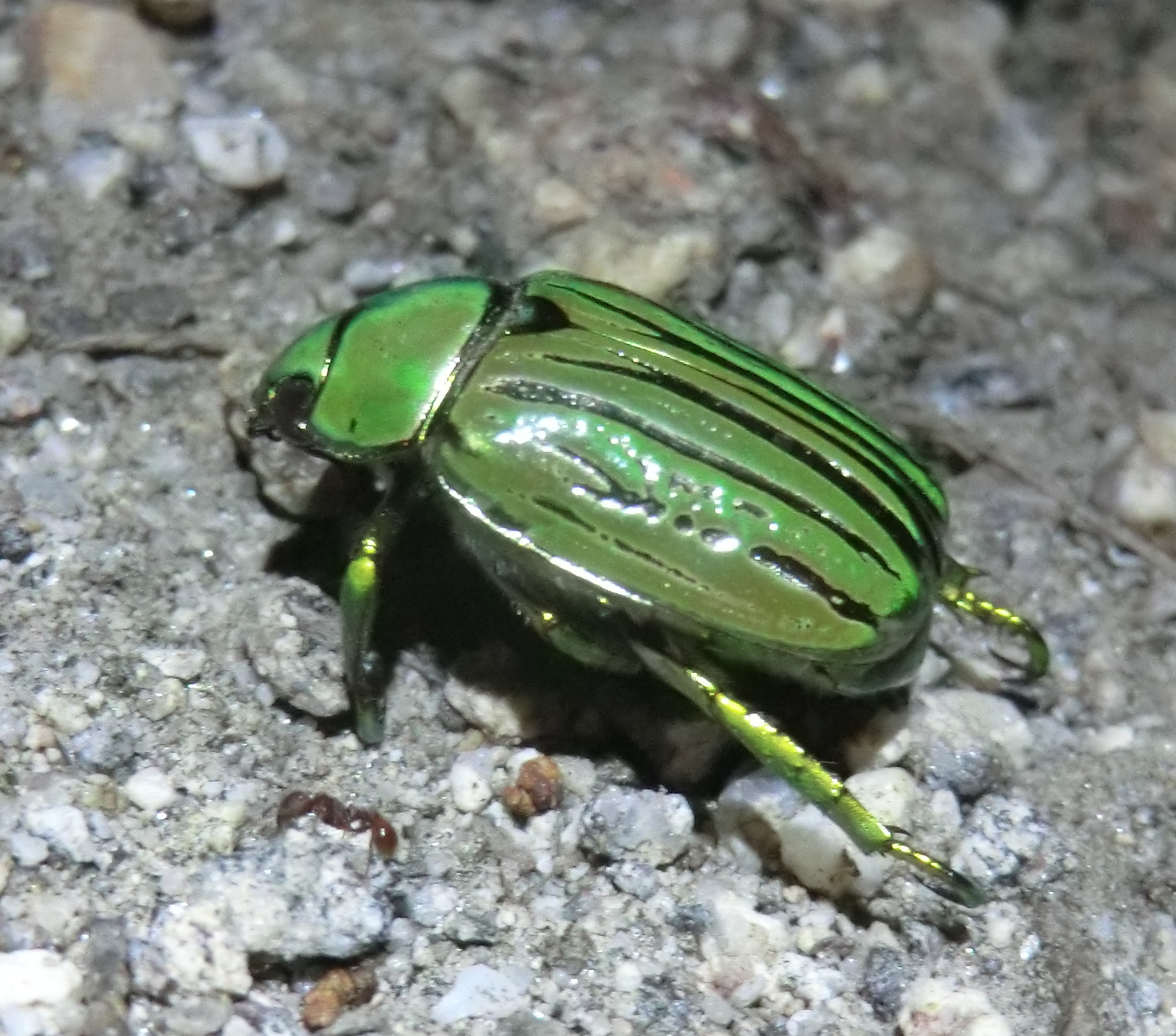
C. gloriosa is one of four species in the United States (the others are C. beyeri, C. lecontei and C. woodi)

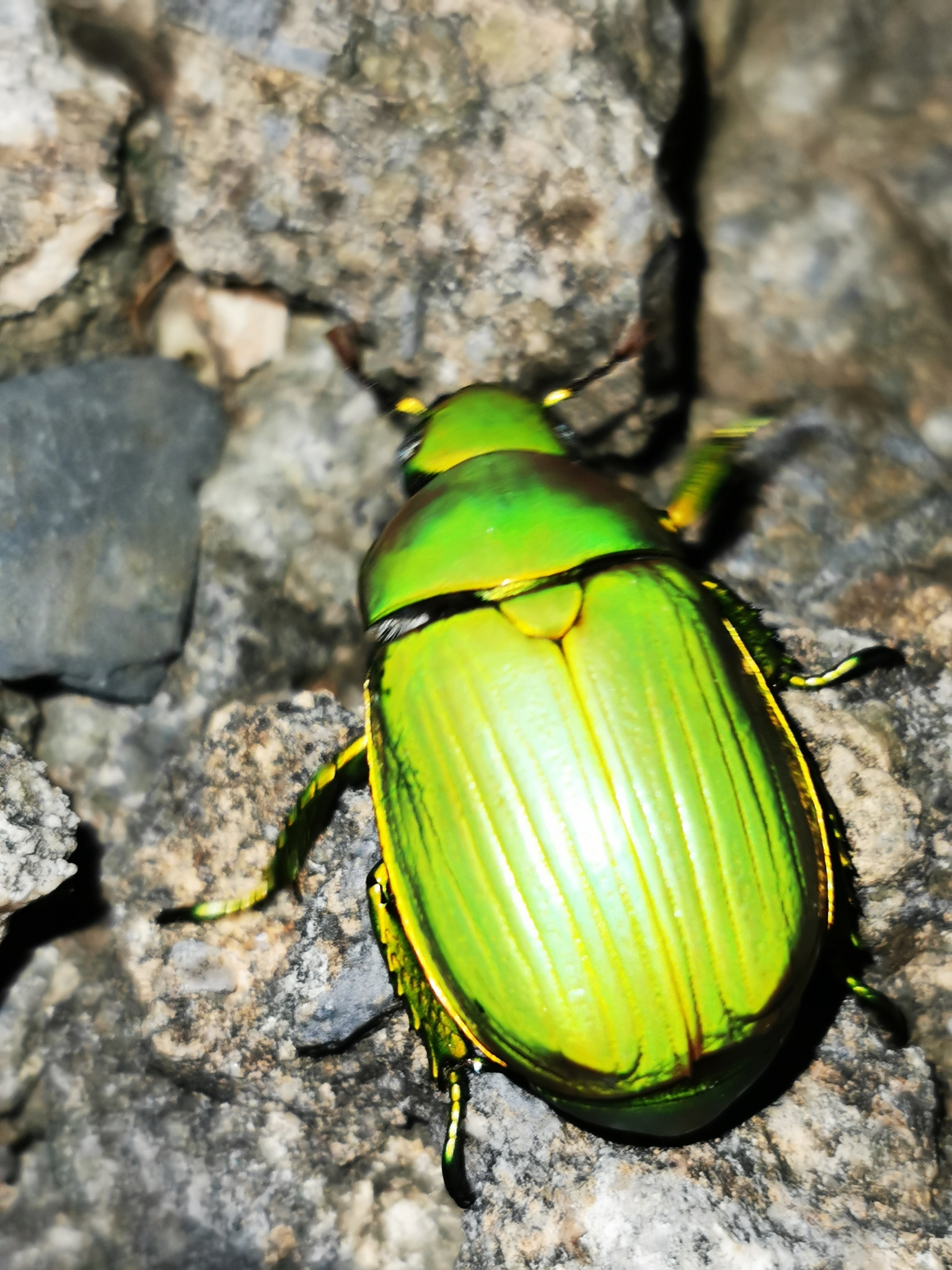
C. psittacina is found only in Mexico

- Chrysina adelaida (Hope, 1841)
- Chrysina adolphi Chevrolat, 1859
- Chrysina alexae Monzón, 2017
- Chrysina alfredolaui (Hawks, 1995)
- Chrysina alphabarrerai (Morón, 1981)
- Chrysina amalia (Burmeister, 1844)
- Chrysina antonkozlovi Monzón, 2017
- Chrysina arellanoi Monzón, 2012
- Chrysina argenteola (H. Bates, 1888)
- Chrysina aurigans (Rothschild & Jordan, 1894)
- Chrysina aurilisternum Perez-Flores, Villagomez & Galindo, 2016
- Chrysina auripes Gray, 1832
- Chrysina aurofoveata (Morón, 1981)
- Chrysina auropunctata (Ohaus, 1913)
- Chrysina aurora (Boucard, 1875)
- Chrysina badeni (Boucard, 1878)
- Chrysina baileyana Monzón, 2010
- Chrysina batesi (Boucard, 1875)
- Chrysina beckeri H. Bates, 1889
- Chrysina benesi Pokorný & Curoe, 2012
- Chrysina beraudi (Warner, Hawks & Bruyea, 1992)
- Chrysina beyeri (Skinner, 1905)
- Chrysina blackalleri Monzón & García, 2011
- Chrysina boucardi (Sallé, 1878)
- Chrysina brevis (Rothschild & Jordan, 1894)
- Chrysina bruyeai (Hawks, 1999)
- Chrysina cavei Hawks & Bruyea, 1999
- Chrysina centralis (Morón, 1990)
- Chrysina chalcothea (H. Bates, 1888)
- Chrysina chimalapensis Mora-Aguilar, Curoe, Delgado & Ramírez-Ponce 2018
- Chrysina chloreis (H. Bates, 1888)
- Chrysina chrysargyrea (Sallé, 1874)
- Chrysina chrysopedila (H. Bates, 1888)
- Chrysina citlaltepetlamayatli (Blackaller-Bages & Delgado, 1994)
- Chrysina clavellina Monzón, Blackaller, & Hawks, 2020
- Chrysina clypealis (Rothschild & Jordan, 1894)
- Chrysina colima (Morón, 1992)
- Chrysina confusa (Ohaus, 1913)
- Chrysina costata (Blanchard, 1850)
- Chrysina crassimargo (Rothschild & Jordan, 1894)
- Chrysina cunninghami (Curoe, 1999)
- Chrysina cupreomarginata (F. Bates, 1904)
- Chrysina curoei (Warner, LeBlanc, Hawks & Bruyea, 1992)
- Chrysina cusuquensis (Curoe, 1994)
- Chrysina dianae (Ratcliffe & Taylor, 1992)
- Chrysina difficilis (Morón, 1990)
- Chrysina diversa (Ohaus, 1912)
- Chrysina donthomasi Monzón & García, 2011
- Chrysina dzidorhum (Arnaud, 1994)
- Chrysina ericsmithi (Monzón & Cano, 1999)
- Chrysina erubescens H. Bates, 1889
- Chrysina expansa (Ohaus, 1913)
- Chrysina eyai Curoe, 2012
- Chrysina falcifera Hawks, 2017
- Chrysina flohri (Ohaus, 1905)
- Chrysina gaitalica Curoe, 2012
- Chrysina galbina Hawks, 2017
- Chrysina giesberti Monzón, 2010
- Chrysina gloriosa (Leconte, 1854)
- Chrysina gorda Delgado, 2003
- Chrysina guatemalensis (Monzón, Cano & Bailey, 1999)
- Chrysina guaymi (Curoe, 2001)
- Chrysina halffteri (Morón, 1990)
- Chrysina hawksi Monzón, 2010
- Chrysina howdenorum (Morón, 1990)
- Chrysina intermedia (Ohaus, 1913)
- Chrysina juxtaprasina Hawks, 2017
- Chrysina kalinini Zubov & Ivshin, 2019
- Chrysina karschi (Nonfried, 1891)
- Chrysina lacordairei (Boucard, 1875)
- Chrysina laniventris (Sturm, 1843)
- Chrysina lecontei (Horn, 1882)
- Chrysina limbata (Rothschild & Jordan, 1894)
- Chrysina luteomarginata (Ohaus, 1913)
- Chrysina macropus (Francillon, 1795)
- Chrysina magnistriata (Morón, 1990)
- Chrysina maishei Monzón, 2017
- Chrysina marginata (Waterhouse, 1871)
- Chrysina mercedesae Barria, 2022
- Chrysina miguelangeli Nogueira & Curoe, 2012
- Chrysina misteca (Morón, 1990)
- Chrysina modesta (Sturm, 1843)
- Chrysina moroni (Curoe & Beraud, 1994)
- Chrysina nogueirai (Morón, 1992)
- Chrysina ofidiodontophallica Curoe, 2011
- Chrysina optima (H. Bates, 1888)
- Chrysina oreicola (Morón, 1992)
- Chrysina orizabae (H. Bates, 1889)
- Chrysina pastori (Curoe, 1994)
- Chrysina paulseni Hawks, 2017
- Chrysina pehlkei (Ohaus, 1930)
- Chrysina peruviana Kirby, 1828
- Chrysina plusiotina (Ohaus, 1912)
- Chrysina porioni Monzón & Hawks, 2020
- Chrysina prasina (Boucard, 1878)
- Chrysina pricei Hawks, 2020
- Chrysina prototelica (Morón & Howden, 1992)
- Chrysina psittacina (Sturm, 1843)
- Chrysina purpurata (Morón, 1990)
- Chrysina purulhensis (Monzón & Warner, 1993)
- Chrysina quetzalcoatli (Morón, 1990)
- Chrysina quiche (Morón, 1990)
- Chrysina ratcliffei (Morón, 1990)
- Chrysina resplendens (Boucard, 1875)
- Chrysina robackeri Hawks, 2020
- Chrysina rodriguezi (Boucard, 1878)
- Chrysina sagacita Hawks, 2017
- Chrysina sallaei (Boucard, 1875)
- Chrysina schusteri (Monzon, Cano & Bailey, 1999)
- Chrysina sirenicola (Solís & Morón, 1995)
- Chrysina spectabilis (Ratcliffe & Jameson, 1992)
- Chrysina strasseni (Ohaus, 1924)
- Chrysina tapantina (Morón, 1992)
- Chrysina taylori (Morón, 1990)
- Chrysina tecunumani (Cano & Morón, 1995)
- Chrysina terroni (Morón, 1990)
- Chrysina transvolcanica (Morón & Nogueira, 2016)
- Chrysina tricolor (Ohaus, 1922)
- Chrysina triumphalis Morón, 1990
- Chrysina tuerckheimi (Ohaus, 1913)
- Chrysina valentini Zubov & Ivshin, 2019
- Chrysina veraguana (Ohaus, 1922)
- Chrysina victorina (Hope, 1841)
- Chrysina woodi (Horn, 1884)
- Chrysina woodruffi Monzón, 2017
- Chrysina xalixteca (Morón, 1992)
- Chrysina zapoteca (Morón, 1990)
