= Chrysina beraudi =

Scientific classification
- Kingdom: Animalia
- Phylum: Arthropoda
- Clade: Pancrustacea
- Class: Insecta
- Order: Coleoptera
- Suborder: Polyphaga
- Infraorder: Scarabaeiformia
- Family: Scarabaeidae
- Genus: Chrysina
- Species: C. beraudi

Binomial name
- Chrysina beraudi (Warner, Hawks, Bruyea & Leblanc, 1992)

Synonyms
- Plusiotis beraudi Warner, Hawks, Bruyea & Leblanc, 1992

Species of beetle

Chrysina beraudi is a species of beetle in the family Scarabaeidae, found in Costa Rica. Discovered by French-Mexican enthomologist Jean-Pierre Béraud
