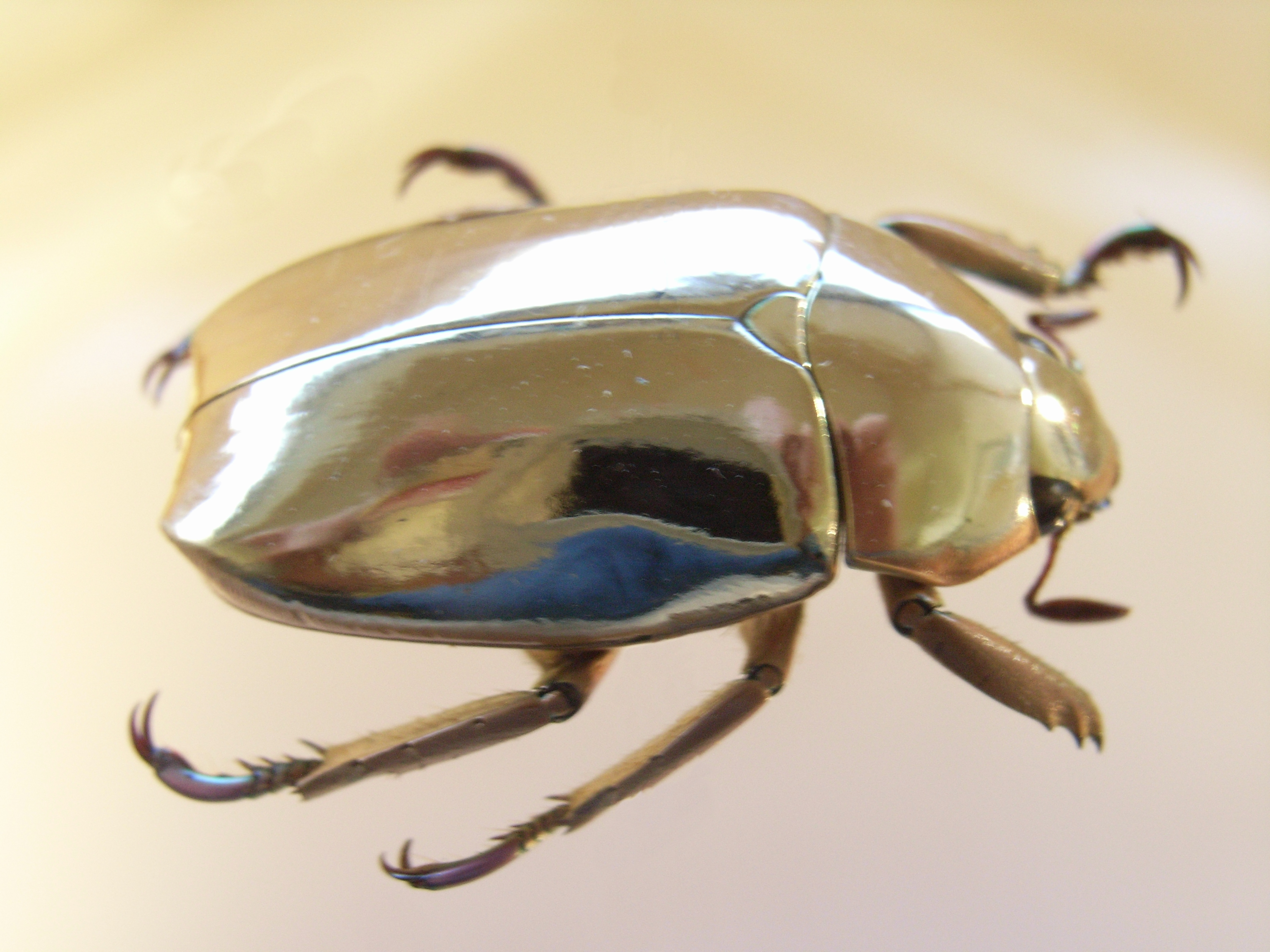

Scientific classification
- Kingdom: Animalia
- Phylum: Arthropoda
- Clade: Pancrustacea
- Class: Insecta
- Order: Coleoptera
- Suborder: Polyphaga
- Infraorder: Scarabaeiformia
- Family: Scarabaeidae
- Subfamily: Rutelinae
- Tribe: Rutelini
- Genus: Chrysina
- Species: C. limbata

Binomial name
- Chrysina limbata (Rothschild & Jordan, 1894)

Synonyms
- Plusiotis limbata Rothschild & Jordan, 1894

= Chrysina limbata =

Species of beetle

Chrysina limbata is a species of scarab beetle found only in mid-altitude forests in Costa Rica and western Panama. It is in the genus Chrysina, in the subfamily Rutelinae (shining leaf chafers). It is notable for its metallic reflective silver color.

== Taxonomy ==
Chrysina limbata was described in 1894 by zoologists Walter Rothschild and Karl Jordan, initially as Plusiotis limbata - Plusiotis being a synonym of Chrysina. C. limbata is in the superfamily Scarabaeoidea, family Scarabaeidae, subfamily Rutelinae and tribe Rutelini.

== Description ==
Adult C. limbata measure between 24 and 29 mm (0.94–1.14 in) in length. They have a reflective silver metallic appearance which is achieved through thin film interference within layers of chitin. These layers of the chitin coating are chirped (in layers of differing thicknesses), forming a complex multilayer as each layer decreases in depth; as the thickness changes, so too does the optical path-length. Each chirped layer is tuned to a different wavelength of light. The multilayer found on C. limbata reflects close to 97% of light across the visible wavelength range.

Physicist William E. Vargas believes that the metallic appearance may act like water, appearing only as a bright spot to predators. The rain forest of Costa Rica where C. limbata lives has water suspended from leaves at ground level. Light is refracted in different directions, and it allows metallic beetles to fool predators.

== Life history ==
Only the adult beetle stage of Chrysina limbata is known; its immature stages are entirely unknown. Like all beetles, scarabs go through a metamorphosis. The life cycle begins when the female lays an egg, which becomes a larva, then a c-shaped pupa, which becomes an adult. The scarab beetles lay their eggs in the ground or in decomposing materials. Larvae feed on plant roots or rotting matter.
