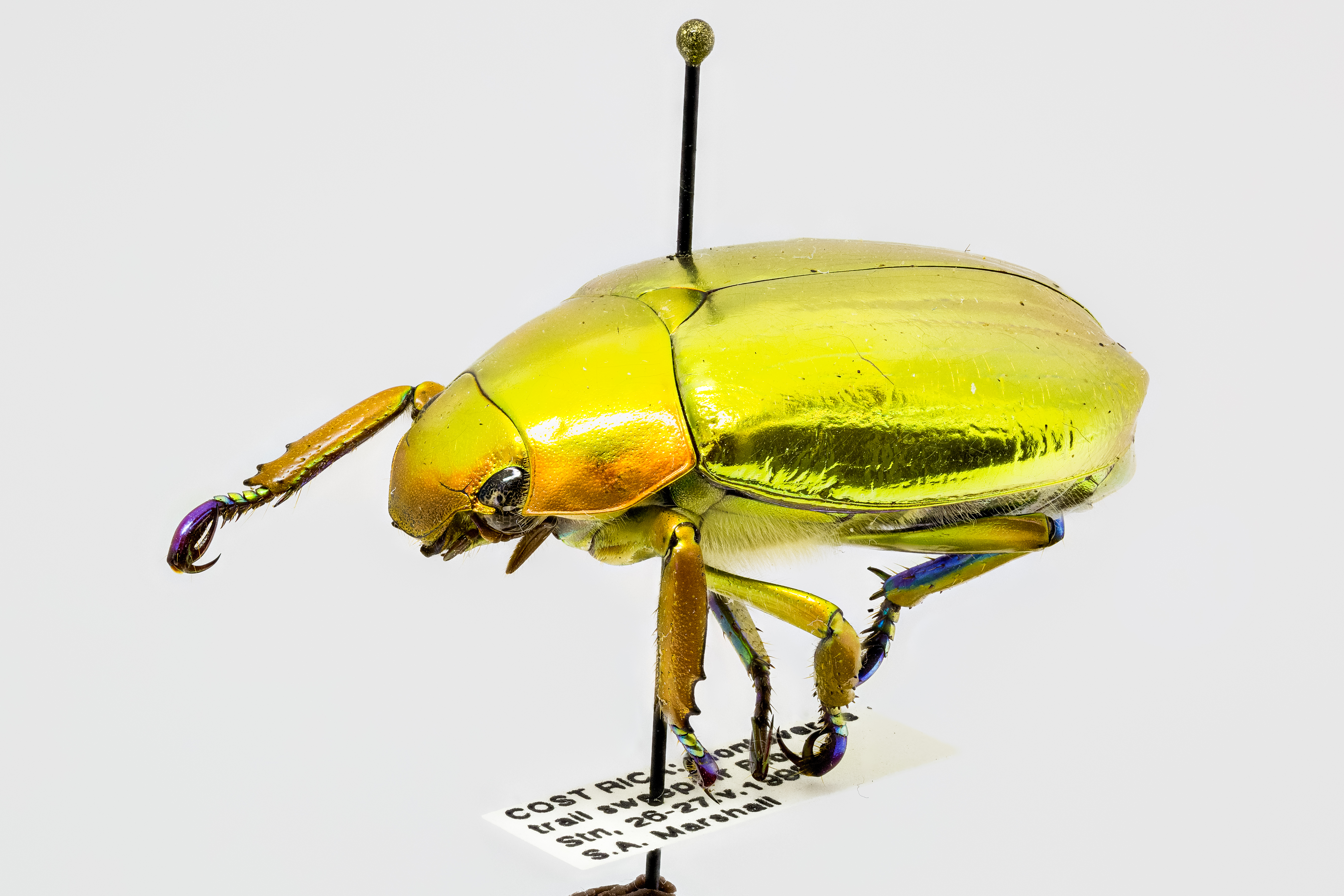

Scientific classification
- Kingdom: Animalia
- Phylum: Arthropoda
- Clade: Pancrustacea
- Class: Insecta
- Order: Coleoptera
- Suborder: Polyphaga
- Infraorder: Scarabaeiformia
- Family: Scarabaeidae
- Genus: Chrysina
- Species: C. aurigans

Binomial name
- Chrysina aurigans (Rothschild & Jordan, 1894)

= Chrysina aurigans =

Species of beetle

Chrysina aurigans is a species of scarab beetle found in Costa Rica. It is notable for its golden color.

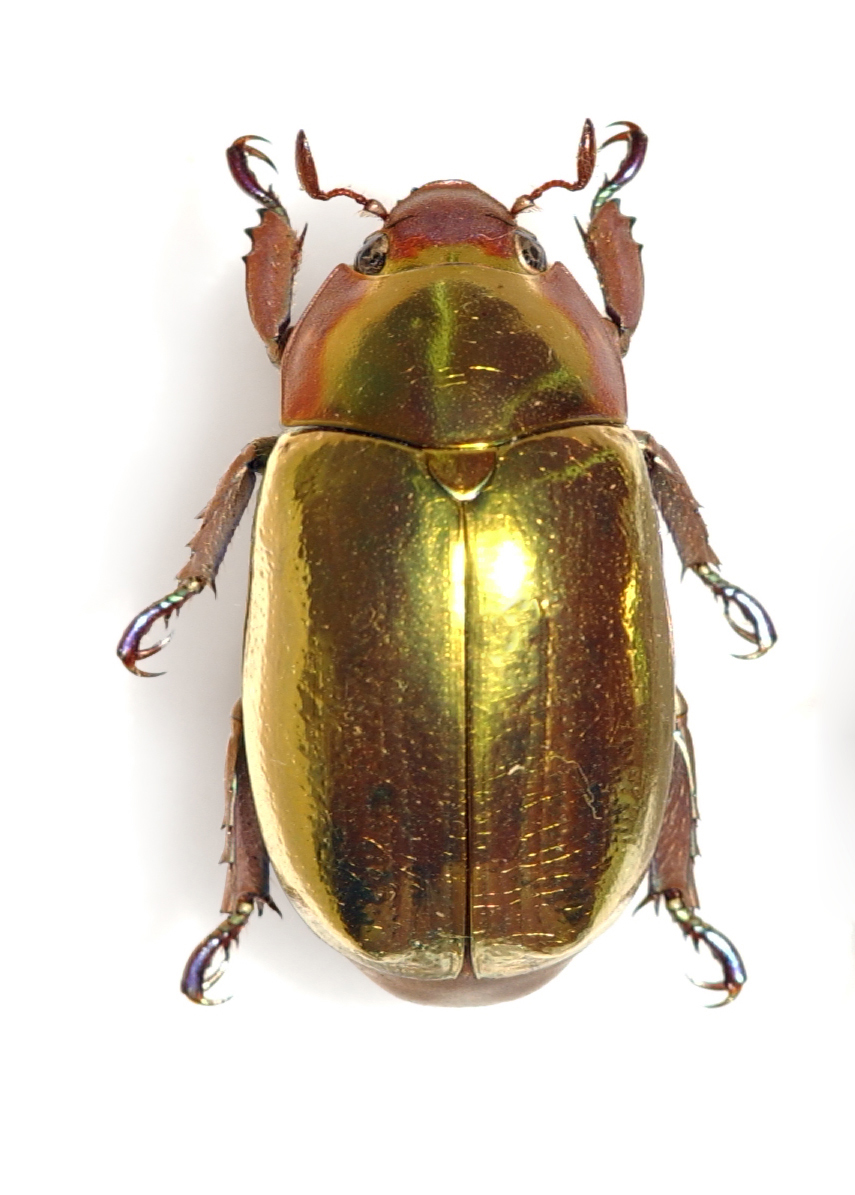
Typical golden color form

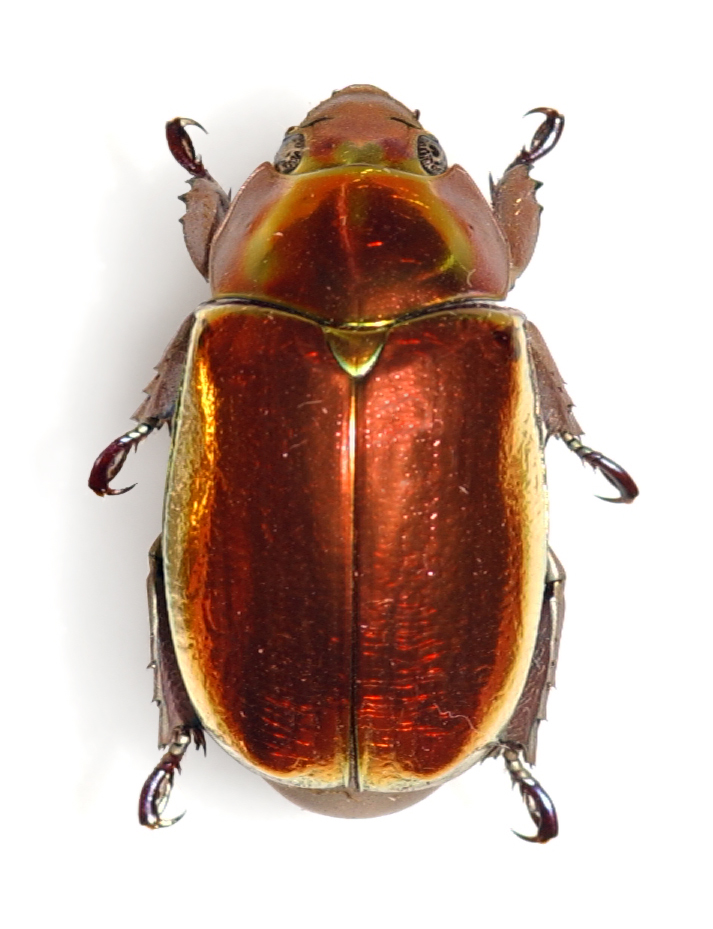
Red color form
