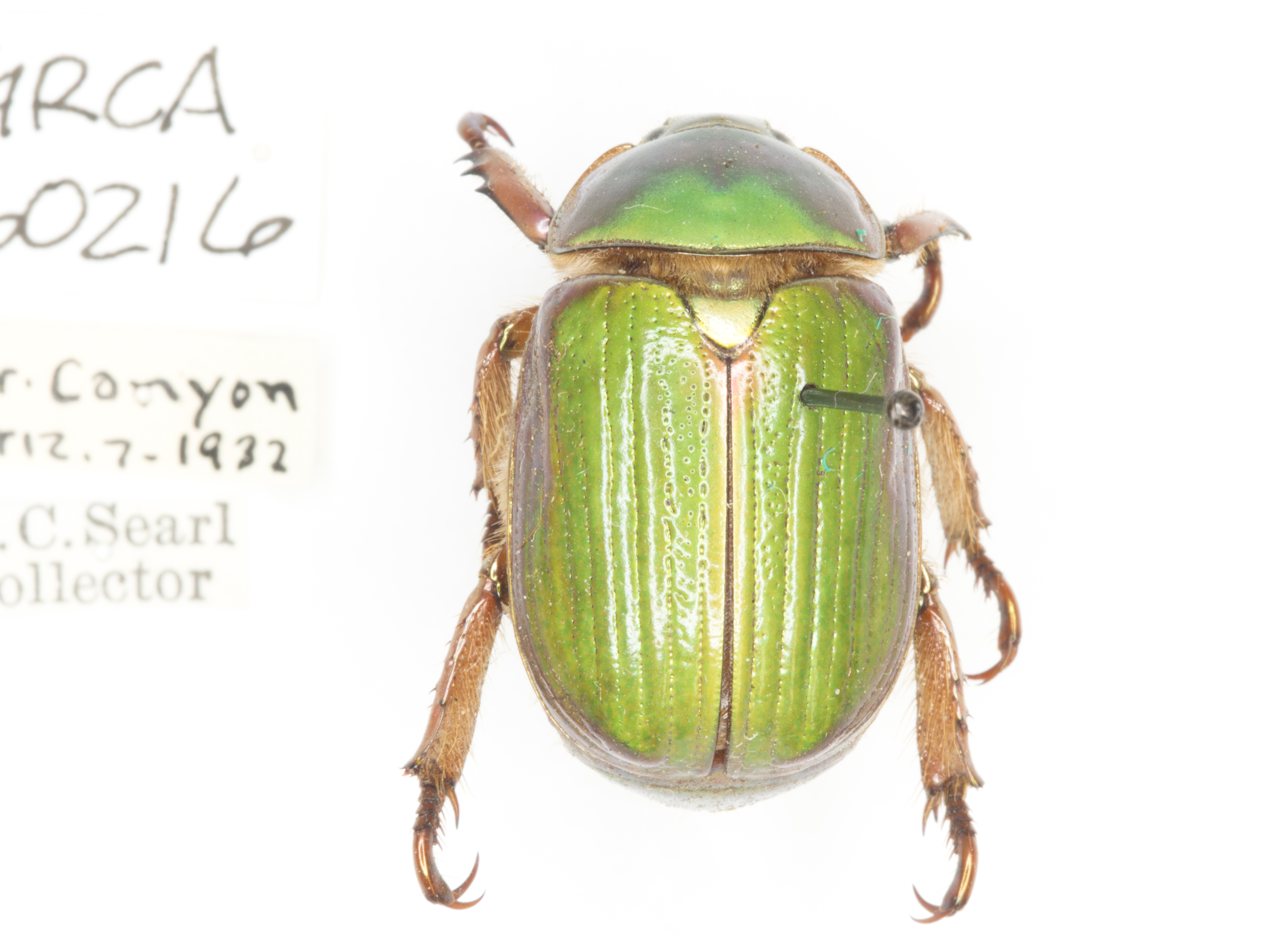
- Specimen

Scientific classification
- Kingdom: Animalia
- Phylum: Arthropoda
- Clade: Pancrustacea
- Class: Insecta
- Order: Coleoptera
- Suborder: Polyphaga
- Infraorder: Scarabaeiformia
- Family: Scarabaeidae
- Genus: Chrysina
- Species: C. lecontei

Binomial name
- Chrysina lecontei (Horn, 1882)

Synonyms
- Plusiotina aeruginis Casey, 1915; Plusiotina angusta Casey, 1915; Plusiotina sonorica Casey, 1915; Plusiotina subenodis Casey, 1915

= Chrysina lecontei =

Species of beetle

Chrysina lecontei, or Leconte's chrysina, is a species of shining leaf chafer in the family of beetles known as Scarabaeidae. It is found in southern United States (Arizona and New Mexico) and northern Mexico (Chihuahua, Durango, Sinaloa, Sonora and Zacatecas).
