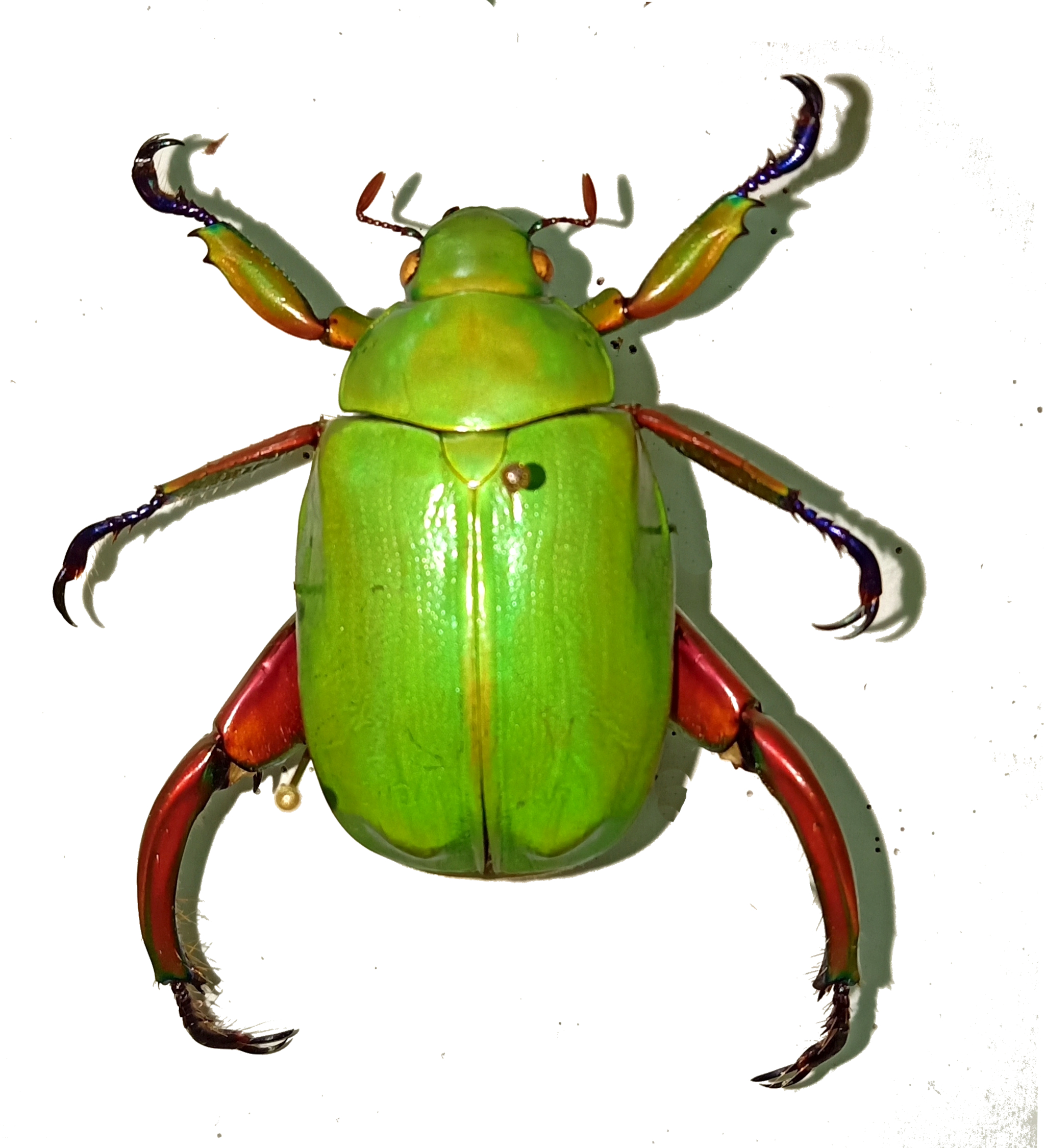

Scientific classification
- Kingdom: Animalia
- Phylum: Arthropoda
- Clade: Pancrustacea
- Class: Insecta
- Order: Coleoptera
- Suborder: Polyphaga
- Infraorder: Scarabaeiformia
- Family: Scarabaeidae
- Genus: Chrysina
- Species: C. adolphi

Binomial name
- Chrysina adolphi Chevrolat, 1859

= Chrysina adolphi =

Species of beetle

Chrysina adolphi is a species of ruteline scarab beetle from Mexico. They are found in the Sierra Madre del Sur in the Mexican states of Guerrero and Oaxaca. Adults emerge from July to September and they feed on oak leaves.
