= Bicellonycha =

Scientific classification
- Kingdom: Animalia
- Phylum: Arthropoda
- Class: Insecta
- Order: Coleoptera
- Suborder: Polyphaga
- Infraorder: Elateriformia
- Family: Lampyridae
- Subfamily: Photurinae
- Genus: Bicellonycha; Motschulsky, 1853

Genus of beetles

Bicellonycha is a genus of fireflies in the beetle family Lampyridae. There are more than 40 described species in Bicellonycha.

== Species ==
These 42 species belong to the genus Bicellonycha:

- Bicellonycha albomarginata Zaragoza, 1989
- Bicellonycha amoena (Gorham, 1880)
- Bicellonycha atra Pic, 1927
- Bicellonycha bipartita Pic, 1927
- Bicellonycha boliviana Zaragoza, 1989
- Bicellonycha brasiliana Zaragoza, 1989
- Bicellonycha bruchi E. Olivier, 1911
- Bicellonycha brunneonotata Pic, 1930
- Bicellonycha catharina Zaragoza, 1989
- Bicellonycha championi Zaragoza, 1989
- Bicellonycha collaris Gorham, 1880
- Bicellonycha colombiana Zaragoza, 1989
- Bicellonycha crassa Gorham, 1884
- Bicellonycha cyathigera (Gorham, 1881)
- Bicellonycha deleta (Motschulsky, 1854)
- Bicellonycha depressa (E. Olivier, 1886)
- Bicellonycha dimidiata (Blanchard in Brullé, 1846)
- Bicellonycha discicollis (Gorham, 1881)
- Bicellonycha gibba Pic, 1930
- Bicellonycha gorhami Zaragoza, 1989
- Bicellonycha limbata Pic, 1924
- Bicellonycha lineola (Blanchard in Brullé, 1846)
- Bicellonycha lividipennis Motschulsky, 1854
- Bicellonycha lucidicollis Gorham, 1880
- Bicellonycha melanura Motschulsky, 1854
- Bicellonycha mexicana Gorham, 1880
- Bicellonycha multilineata Pic, 1930
- Bicellonycha oliveri Zaragoza, 1989
- Bicellonycha ornaticollis (Blanchard in Brullé, 1846)
- Bicellonycha panamensis Zaragoza, 1989
- Bicellonycha peruana Zaragoza, 1989
- Bicellonycha pici Zaragoza, 1989
- Bicellonycha postcutellaris Pic, 1927
- Bicellonycha pulchella E. Olivier, 1886
- Bicellonycha rospigliosi Brèthes, 1920
- Bicellonycha ruficollis (Gorham, 1880)
- Bicellonycha sallei Zaragoza, 1989
- Bicellonycha signata (E. Olivier, 1886)
- Bicellonycha stigmatica (E. Olivier, 1886)
- Bicellonycha tenuicornis (E. Olivier, 1886)
- Bicellonycha thiemeni Zaragoza, 1989
- Bicellonycha wickershamorum Cicero, 1982
