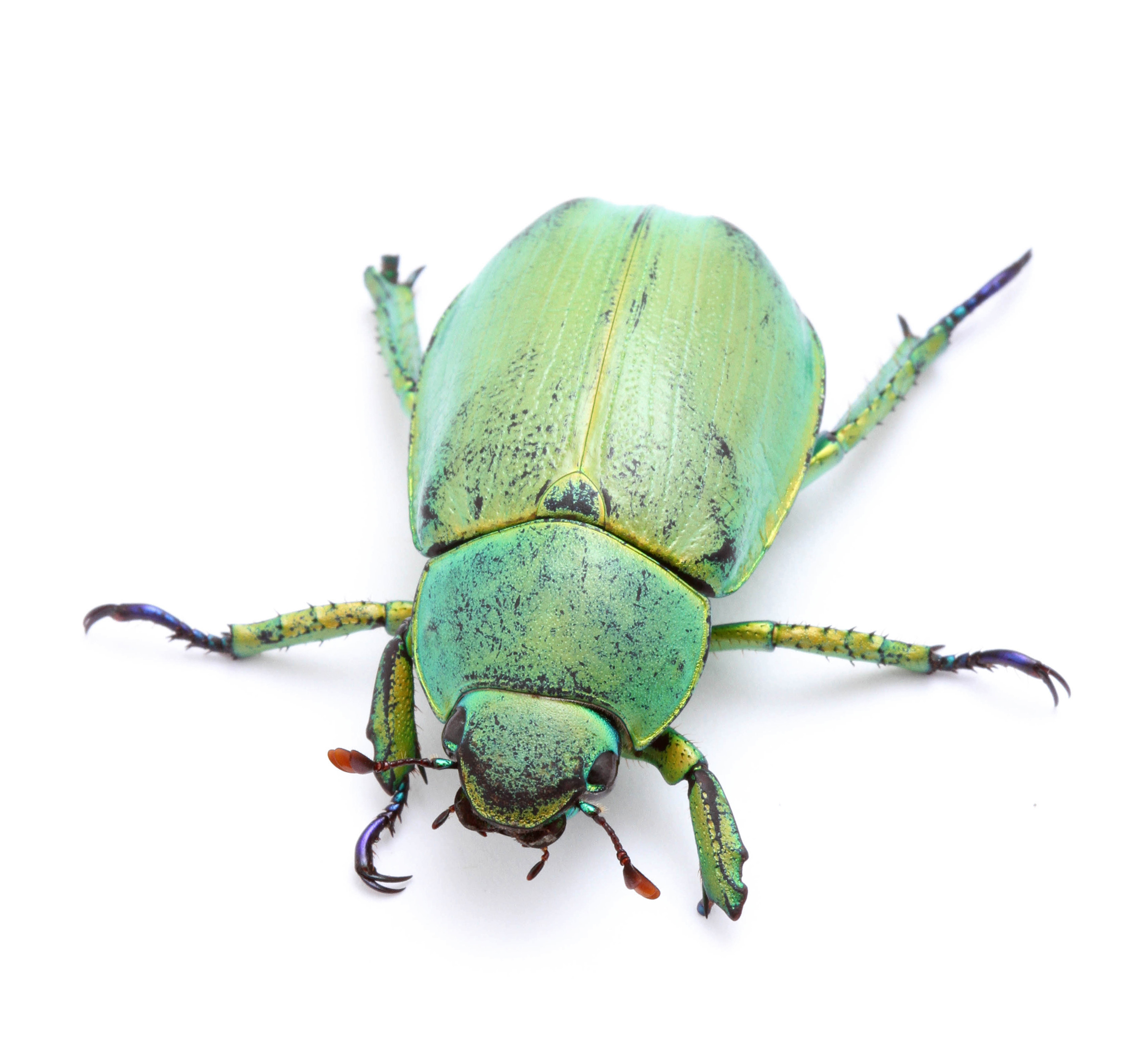

Scientific classification
- Kingdom: Animalia
- Phylum: Arthropoda
- Clade: Pancrustacea
- Class: Insecta
- Order: Coleoptera
- Suborder: Polyphaga
- Infraorder: Scarabaeiformia
- Family: Scarabaeidae
- Genus: Chrysina
- Species: C. woodi

Binomial name
- Chrysina woodi (Horn, 1884)

Synonyms
- Plusiotis woodi Horn, 1884; Plusiotis woodii Horn, 1885; Chrysina woodii (Horn, 1885)

= Chrysina woodi =

Species of beetle

Chrysina woodi, or Wood's jewel scarab, is a species of shining leaf chafer in the family of beetles known as Scarabaeidae. This bright green beetle is native to Chihuahua in Mexico, and New Mexico and Texas in the United States. This beetle is 25–35 mm (1.0–1.4 in) long and it resembles C. beyeri, but that species has all blue-purple legs and tarsi (in C. woodi, the legs are green and the tarsi blue).

The name was first published in the minutes of a meeting in 1884 as woodi, in advance of the formal description of the species as woodii in 1885, but under ICZN Article 50.2, the 1884 name and spelling take precedence.

Adults of this species have been documented feeding mostly on Texas black walnut (Juglans microcarpa), but they have also been reported to feed on a small number of additional plants.
