= Chrysina hawksi =

Scientific classification
- Kingdom: Animalia
- Phylum: Arthropoda
- Clade: Pancrustacea
- Class: Insecta
- Order: Coleoptera
- Suborder: Polyphaga
- Infraorder: Scarabaeiformia
- Family: Scarabaeidae
- Genus: Chrysina
- Species: C. hawksi

Binomial name
- Chrysina hawksi Monzón, 2010

Synonyms
- Chrysina gaellae Ebrard & Soula, 2010 (Unav.); Chrysina galenae Ebrard & Soula, 2010 (Missp.); Chrysina rutelidedundeei Soula, 2012 (Unav.); Chrysina rutelidundeei Soula, 2012 (Missp.)

Species of beetle

Chrysina hawksi is a species of ruteline scarab beetle from Central America, known from Guatemala (Baja Verapaz, Huehuetenango, and Zacapa) and Mexico (Chiapas).
