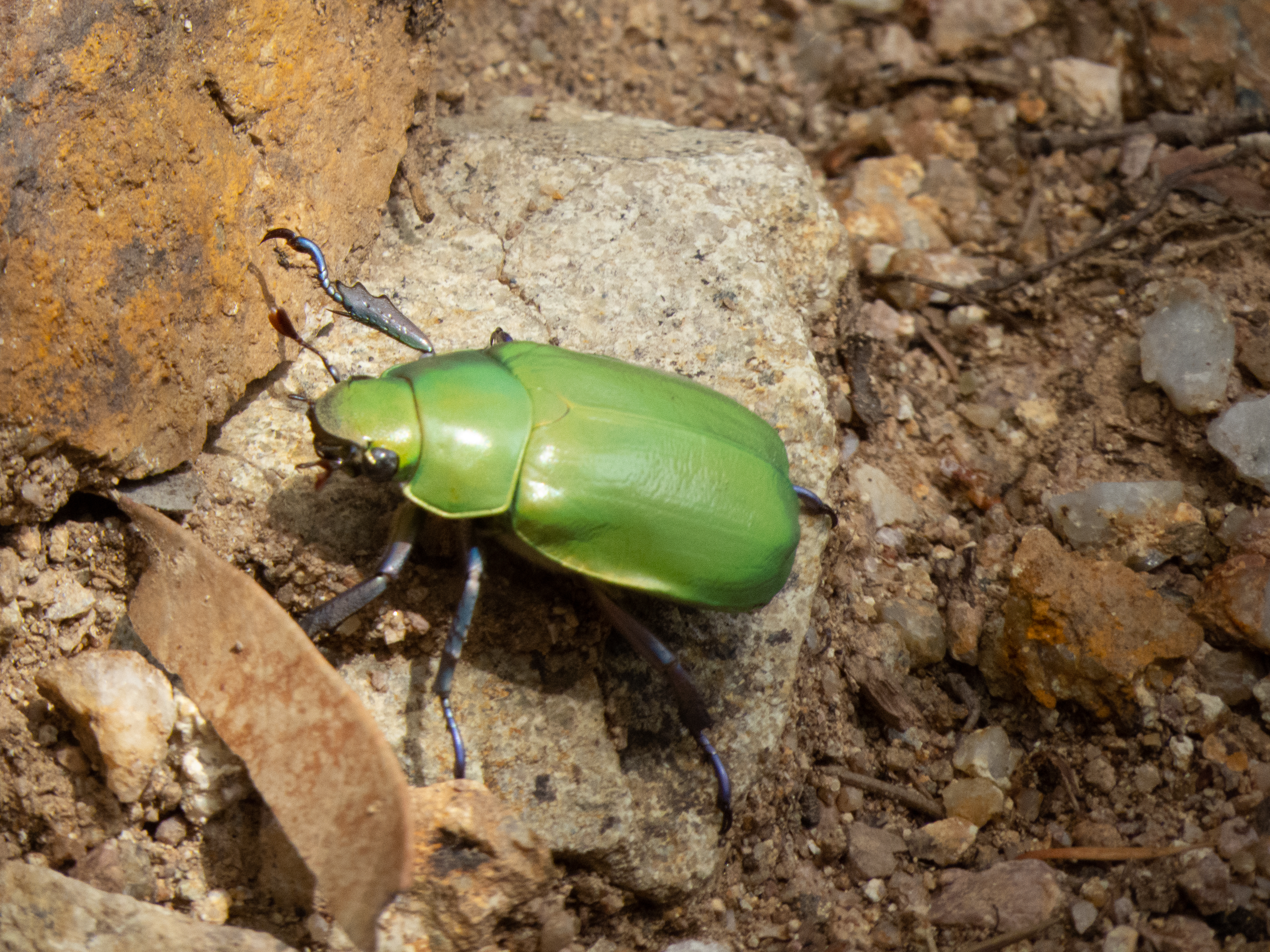

Scientific classification
- Kingdom: Animalia
- Phylum: Arthropoda
- Clade: Pancrustacea
- Class: Insecta
- Order: Coleoptera
- Suborder: Polyphaga
- Infraorder: Scarabaeiformia
- Family: Scarabaeidae
- Genus: Chrysina
- Species: C. beyeri

Binomial name
- Chrysina beyeri (Skinner, 1905)

Synonyms
- Plusiotis ampliata Casey, 1915; Plusiotis ocularis Casey, 1915

= Chrysina beyeri =

Species of beetle

Chrysina beyeri, or Beyer's scarab, is a species of shining leaf chafer in the family of beetles known as Scarabaeidae. This bright green beetle is native to Chihuahua in Mexico and southeastern Arizona in the United States. It resembles C. woodi in both size and general appearance, but that species has green legs and blue tarsi (in C. beyeri, the legs and tarsi are both blue-purple).
