= Photuris bethaniensis =

Bethany Beach firefly

Conservation status
- Critically Endangered (IUCN 3.1)

Scientific classification
- Kingdom: Animalia
- Phylum: Arthropoda
- Class: Insecta
- Order: Coleoptera
- Suborder: Polyphaga
- Infraorder: Elateriformia
- Family: Lampyridae
- Genus: Photuris
- Species: P. bethaniensis

Binomial name
- Photuris bethaniensis Frank A. McDermott in Bethany, 1953

Species of damselfly

Photuris bethaniensis, also known as the Bethany Beach firefly, is a species of firefly in the genus Photuris. It is found in interdunal swale habitats along a 25 kilometre stretch of shoreline in Sussex County, Delaware. It is extremely rare and in decline. The main threats to this species include habitat loss due to coastal development, sea level rise, light pollution, and the lowering of groundwater aquifers. This species has an estimated extent of occurrence of 33 km^{2}, and the entire population occurs within one location, as the main threat (sea level rise) will probably impact all sites within the current known distribution by the end of the century. Various historical collection sites no longer contain this species, and the occurrence locality thought to hold the largest number of individuals, has recently been lost to a housing development. Therefore, continuing decline in the area of occupancy has been observed; continuing decline in the extent of occurrence is projected, as all remaining occurrences contain few individuals and face myriad threats; continuing decline in the area, extent, and quality of habitat has been observed; continuing decline in locations is projected as the sea level rises; and, as a result of the recent loss of a site, a decline in the number of mature individuals is inferred. As such, this species is listed as Critically Endangered under criteria B1ab (i, ii, iii, iv, v).
