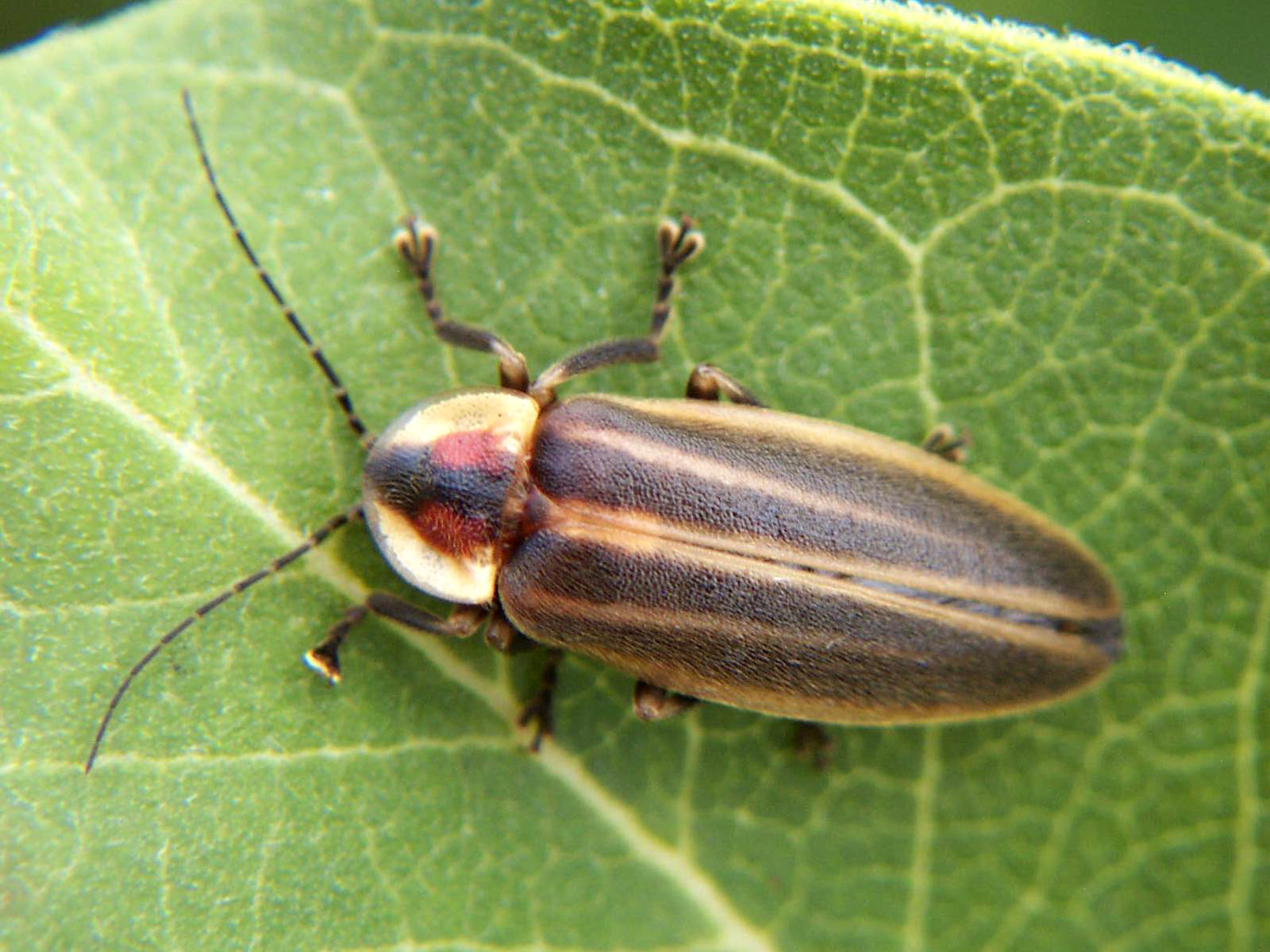
- P. lucicrescens

Scientific classification
- Kingdom: Animalia
- Phylum: Arthropoda
- Clade: Pancrustacea
- Class: Insecta
- Order: Coleoptera
- Suborder: Polyphaga
- Infraorder: Elateriformia
- Family: Lampyridae
- Subfamily: Photurinae
- Genus: Photuris; Dejean, 1833

Species
- See text

= Photuris =

Genus of beetles

Photuris is a genus of fireflies (beetles of the family Lampyridae). The adult females of this genus are notable for preying on other fireflies. They engage in aggressive mimicry, imitating the light signals that other firefly species' females use to attract mates – but Photuris use it to attract, kill and eat the unsuspecting males of those other species. Their flashing bioluminescent signals seem to have evolved independently and eventually adapted to those of their prey, mainly unrelated Lampyrinae, such as Photinus (rover fireflies) or Pyractomena.

== Species ==
At least 64 species are currently recognized, all restricted to temperate North America. They mainly occur from the East Coast to Texas. Species include:

- Photuris aureolucens – Barber, 1951
- Photuris bethaniensis – McDermott, 1953 (Bethany Beach firefly)
- Photuris caerulucens – Barber, 1951 (slow blues)
- Photuris cinctipennis – Barber, 1951
- Photuris congener – LeConte, 1852 (Florida single snappy)
- Photuris divisa – LeConte, 1852
- Photuris fairchildi – Barber, 1951
- Photuris flavicollis – Fall, 1927
- Photuris floridana – Fall, 1927
- Photuris frontalis – LeConte, 1852 (snappy single sync)
- Photuris hebes – Barber, 1951 (heebie-jeebies)
- Photuris lineaticollis – Motschulsky, 1854
- Photuris lloydi – McDermott, 1966 (Lloyd's predator)
- Photuris lucicrescens – Barber, 1951 (July comet, big scary)
- Photuris missouriensis – McDermott, 1962
- Photuris mysticalampas – Heckscher, 2013 (mystic lanterns, mysterious lantern firefly)
- Photuris pensylvanica – De Geer, 1774 (Pennsylvania firefly)
- Photuris potomaca – Barber, 1951
- Photuris pyralomina – Barber, 1951
- Photuris quadrifulgens – Barber, 1951 (spring 4-flasher)
- Photuris salina – Barber, 1951
- Photuris tremulans – Barber, 1951 (Christmas lights)
- Photuris versicolor – Fabricius, 1798
- Photuris walldoxeyi – Faust and Davis, 2019 (cypress firefly)
