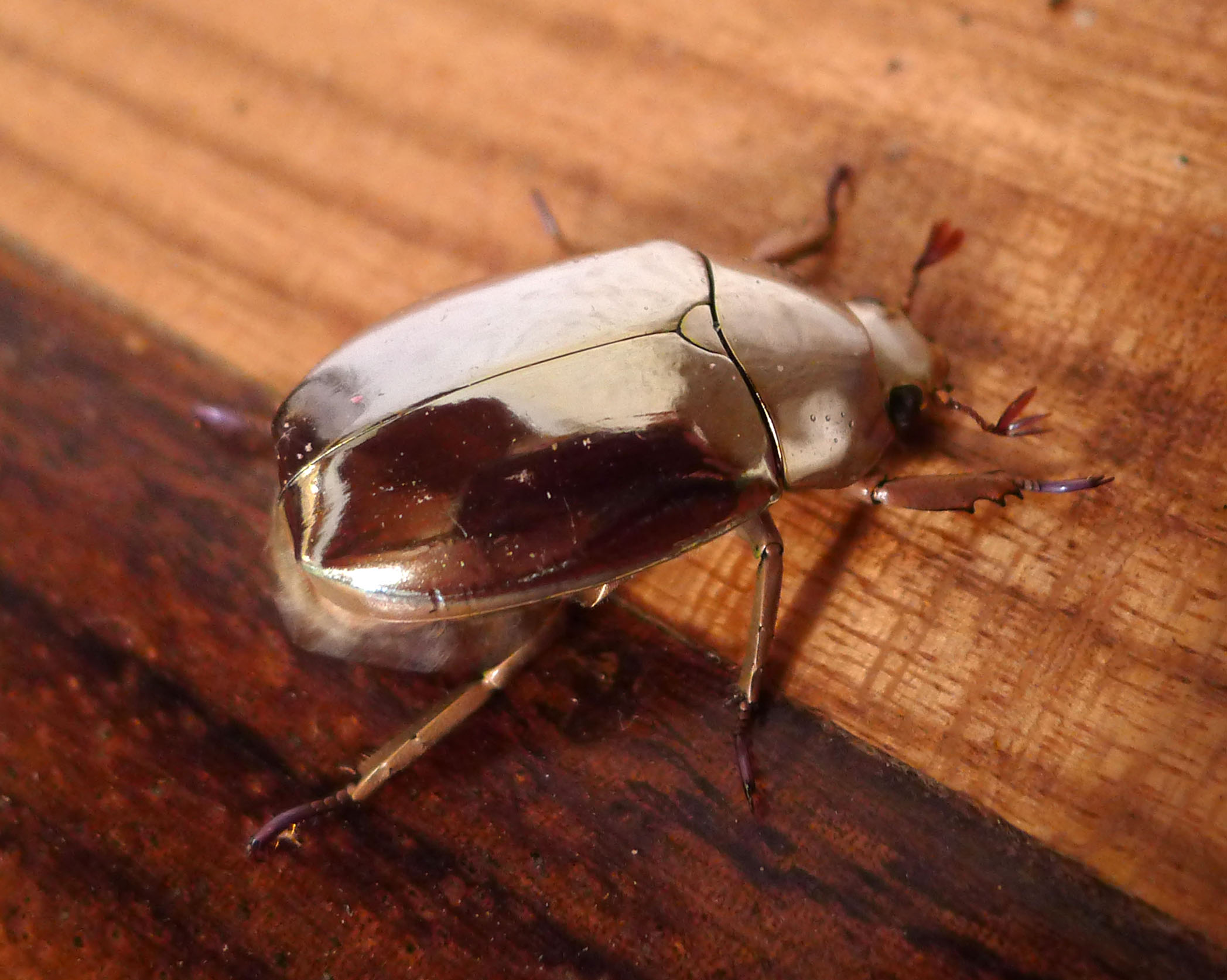

Scientific classification
- Kingdom: Animalia
- Phylum: Arthropoda
- Clade: Pancrustacea
- Class: Insecta
- Order: Coleoptera
- Suborder: Polyphaga
- Infraorder: Scarabaeiformia
- Family: Scarabaeidae
- Genus: Chrysina
- Species: C. resplendens

Binomial name
- Chrysina resplendens (Boucard, 1875)

Synonyms
- Plusiotis resplendens Boucard, 1875

= Chrysina resplendens =

Species of beetle

Chrysina resplendens is a scarab beetle found in mid-elevation forests in Costa Rica and western Panama. This beetle is typically shiny golden and has a length of 25–29 mm (0.98–1.14 in).
