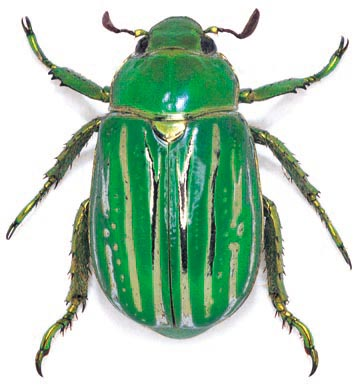

Scientific classification
- Kingdom: Animalia
- Phylum: Arthropoda
- Clade: Pancrustacea
- Class: Insecta
- Order: Coleoptera
- Suborder: Polyphaga
- Infraorder: Scarabaeiformia
- Family: Scarabaeidae
- Genus: Chrysina
- Species: C. gloriosa

Binomial name
- Chrysina gloriosa (LeConte, 1854)

Synonyms
- Plusiotis gloriosa LeConte, 1854

= Chrysina gloriosa =

Species of beetle

Chrysina gloriosa is a species of scarab whose common names are glorious beetle and glorious scarab. It is found only in southern United States (southeastern Arizona, southern New Mexico and southwestern Texas) and northern Mexico (Chihuahua and Sonora). The adult beetles, which are active both day and night and primarily seen from June to August, eat juniper leaves and the larvae feed on decaying wood from Arizona sycamore. Although adults feed mainly on juniper leaves, they also visit flowers and can act as incidental pollinators, transferring pollen as they move between blooms. A synonym formerly used for the species is Plusiotis gloriosa.

The adult beetles are 20 to 30 millimetres (0.8–1.2 in) long, and are bright green with silver stripes on the elytra (red and purple color forms occur but are very rare). These iridescent stripes on the cuticle of the elytra are a result of cholesteric liquid crystal organization of chitin molecules. The differences in color are a result of the microscopic structure of each section, with green reflected from cusp-like structures and silver reflected from flat layers parallel to the surface of the elytra. As established through Mueller matrix spectroscopic ellipsometry, the optical properties change with the incidence angle of the propagating light. The polygonal cells in the green stripes generate self-healing Bessel beams.

The species is sometimes incorrectly thought to have been officially recognized as endangered, but it has never been rated by the IUCN or listed under the United States Endangered Species Act. It can be locally abundant.
