= Photuris versicolor =

Conservation status
- Least Concern (IUCN 3.1)

Scientific classification
- Kingdom: Animalia
- Phylum: Arthropoda
- Class: Insecta
- Order: Coleoptera
- Suborder: Polyphaga
- Infraorder: Elateriformia
- Family: Lampyridae
- Genus: Photuris
- Species: P. versicolor

Binomial name
- Photuris versicolor Fabricius, 1798

Species of beetle

Photuris versicolor, is a species complex of firefly common throughout the Eastern United States. Fireflies famously use flash-based visual signalling to find mates at a distance and each species of firefly has a unique flash pattern sequence that males and females of the same species use to identify one another. Researchers have documented the ability of female P. versicolor to hunt males of other firefly species by mimicking the flash responses of female fireflies of other species. Photuris versicolor appear to target males, such as Photinus pyralis, specifically for the lucibufagin steroids that their prey produce.

== Description ==
Photuris versicolor are large members of the Lampyridae family, approximately 20–50 mm (0.8–2.0 in) in length. P. versicolor are strong fliers with excellent eyesight, which is especially sensitive to light in the near UV (380 nm) and green (550 nm) spectra. Although male and female adults both have luminescence, this species is strongly sexually dimorphic. Females are larger bodied with a larger flash organ than males.

== Mating ==
Virgin P. versicolor females respond to the triple flash mating signal of P. versicolor males prior to mating. However, sometime after mating, P. versicolor females become unresponsive to conspecific males and begin using flash signalling in hunting.
