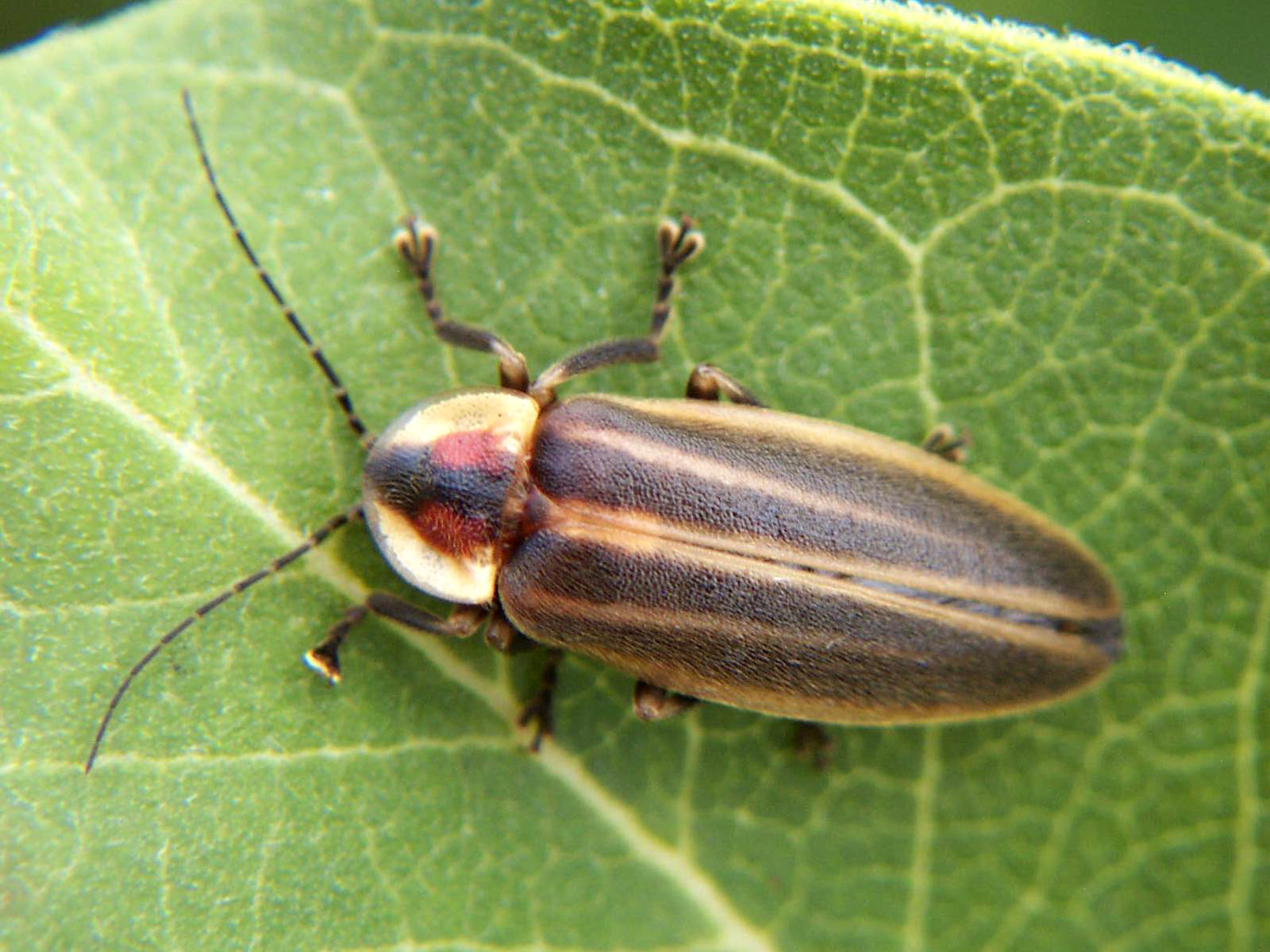

Conservation status
- Least Concern (IUCN 3.1)

Scientific classification
- Kingdom: Animalia
- Phylum: Arthropoda
- Clade: Pancrustacea
- Class: Insecta
- Order: Coleoptera
- Suborder: Polyphaga
- Infraorder: Elateriformia
- Family: Lampyridae
- Genus: Photuris
- Species: P. lucicrescens

Binomial name
- Photuris lucicrescens Barber, 1951

= Photuris lucicrescens =

Species of beetle (firefly)

Photuris lucicrescens, the long crescendo Photuris, July comet, big scary, or big Lucy, is a species of beetle in the Lampyridae family. It is found in the eastern United States.

== Description ==
P. lucicrescens is a large firefly, with adults measuring 15–20 mm (0.6–0.8 in) long. They appear to be hunchbacked when viewed from the side. They have brown wing covers, or elytra, with wide light-colored side margins and stripes in the center of each side, starting from the shoulder and extending almost the entire length of the body. The head shield, or pronotum, is yellow, with a dark arrow in the center, which is often interrupted, appearing as two separate marks. The dark central mark is bounded by red or orange. Photuris fireflies have longer legs than species in the other common firefly genus in the United States, Photinus. The legs are pale close to the body. Lanterns are visible on the abdomen as pale segments.

Cabinet specimens described in the Smithsonian Miscellaneous Collections are noted to have pale coxae, with brownish color of in-fuscate areas. A strong development of the lutescent borders and oblique vitta of elytra, with irregularly lutescent areas in the first three or four visible sternites.

== Life cycle ==
Beetles such as P. lucicrescens go through four life stages: egg, larva, pupa, and adult. Photuris fireflies spend the majority of their lives as larvae, which are bioluminescent. Larvae are predaceous, eating snails, worms, and other soft-bodied invertebrates. Adults appear in mid-summer, from June to August.

== Behavior ==
Adult male P. lucicrescens fireflies fly over vegetation about 45 minutes after sunset and later, flashing to attract the attention of females. Their crescendo flashes are usually coming from low vegetation, sometimes from poising individuals and sometimes from a zig-zag flight pattern. Their flash pattern is very distinctive, with a long, very bright greenish flash with a duration of 0.75 to 2.5 seconds, increasing in intensity enough to illuminate several feet around the beetle, before ending abruptly. The firefly is dark for 5 to 10 seconds before it flashes again. Unlike some other species, P. lucicrescens, mainly relies on neurological input for the timing of the flash rather than by natural rhythmic calcium-controlled activity in the lantern cells. Calcium may still help activate the light-producing reaction inside the cells, but it does not cause the lantern tissue to flash on its own.

In addition to the prominent crescendo flash, males also have a flash pattern that consists of a single, shorter flash, which is approximately 1/10th of a second with intervals of 3-5 seconds, which is easily confused with flashes of other Photuris species. These flashes usually occur in tree canopies rather than low vegetation A female responds with an answering flash from low vegetation. Females also use "aggressive mimicry" to lure other species of fireflies in order to eat them. Because of this behavior, P. lucicrescens are one of the species known as "femme fatales". No other mid-Atlantic or northeastern Photuris species has such variable flashing patterns

It appears that the typical crescendo’s occur earlier in the season (June) and transition to more varied patterns around July in place of the typical crescendo.

== Habitat ==
Photuris lucicrescens is primarily associated with moist, forested floodplain habitats, which are believed to serve as its main breeding environment. While commonly associated with these areas, individuals may disperse beyond them, especially later in the season, and can be found in adjacent forest and edge habitats. Females in particular occupy a broad range of environments, including open fields and wooded areas, in conditions that vary from dry to moderately moist and across elevations from valleys to mountainous regions. In some regions, this species is also found near developed areas close to floodplains, where it may occasionally appear in suburban yards.

== Range ==
Photuris lucicrescens has a broad distribution in eastern North America, occurring in both the United States and Canada (Ontario). Its range spans much of the eastern U.S., from southern New England southward through the Mid Atlantic and Coastal Plain to the Carolina's, and westward into Tennessee, northern Georgia, and Arkansas. It is also reported across much of the central Mississippi Valley and extends into portions of the upper Midwest, including areas such as Michigan and Wisconsin.

The species is less consistently recorded in parts of central Pennsylvania and some adjacent northern regions, though it is likely present along much of the Appalachian corridor from Maryland south through West Virginia, Virginia, and Tennessee. Overall, the species occupies a large range, with an estimated extent of occurrence exceeding 2 million km².
