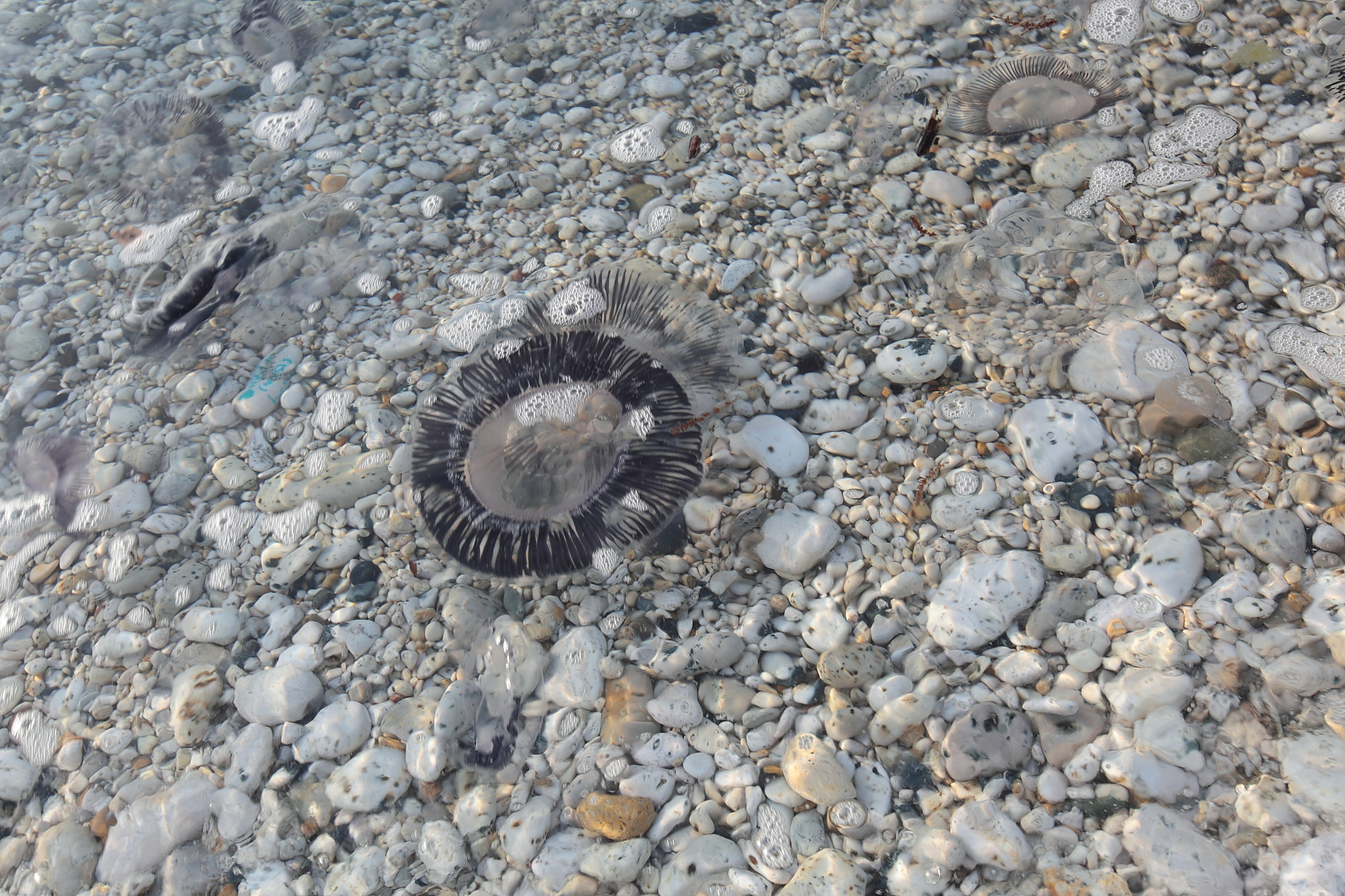

Scientific classification
- Kingdom: Animalia
- Phylum: Cnidaria
- Class: Hydrozoa
- Order: Leptothecata
- Family: Aequoreidae
- Genus: Aequorea
- Species: A. forskalea

Binomial name
- Aequorea forskalea Péron & Lesueur, 1810

Synonyms
- List: Aequorea aequorea (Forsskål, 1775); Medusa aequorea Forsskål, 1775; Aequorea stauroglypha Péron & Lesueur, 1810; Staurobrachium stauroglyphum (Péron & Lesueur, 1810); Aequorea rissoana Risso, 1827; Aequorea forskalina Eschscholtz, 1829; Aequorea violacea Milne Edwards, 1841; Aequorea forbesiana Gosse, 1853; Cremastoma flava A. Agassiz, 1862; Zygodactyla cyanea L. Agassiz, 1862; Mesonema eurystoma Haeckel, 1879; Polycanna fungina Haeckel, 1879; Polycanna germanica Haeckel, 1879; Polycanna italica Haeckel, 1879; Polycanna americana Fewkes, 1886; Rhacostoma dispar Mayer, 1900; Campanulina paracuminata Rees, 1938

= Aequorea forskalea =

Species of hydrozoan

Aequorea forskalea is a species of hydrozoan in the family Aequoreidae. Discovered in 1810 by Péron and Lesueur, A. forskalea was initially found in coastal to offshore waters of the Mediterranean Sea. This species is commonly referred to as the many-ribbed jellyfish. The species is often mixed up with some other members of the genus due to some similarities including the capability of bioluminescence.

== Description ==
During the medusa stage of the life cycle, members of the A. forskalea species have large umbrellas which are thick near the center but gradually thin as they reach the margin of the umbrella. The stomach takes up roughly half of the overall width of the disc. Typically, this species has between 60 and 80 radial canals; however, individuals have been identified as A. forskalea with even fewer or as many as 160 canals. The gonads of this species run throughout nearly the entire width of this hydrozoan. The number of tentacles is usually fewer than the amount of radial canals per individual, but findings have shown that this can vary from half as many to twice as many. The umbrella for this species may span up to 175 mm (6.9 in) across. There are small bulbs scattered around the marginal region while bulbs on the tentacles are conical and elongated. Also, A. forskalea has excretory pores on short papillae and between 5-10 statocysts between neighboring radial canals. Despite containing a bioluminescent protein, aequorin, this species (as well as all other species in the genus) are almost completely colorless.

== Identification ==
Aequorea forskalea is synonymous with many different findings from 1775 to 1938. Even though it may have only been called A. forskalea in 1810, it was still discovered in 1775 as Aequorea aequorea. A reputable marine biologist, Frederick Stratten Russell, authored the book The Medusae of the British Isles in 1953 where he stated that A. forskalea was the acceptable name for these species, and that A. aequorea was a name reserved for an unidentifiable species. One notably similar species, A. victoria is found abundantly in the Pacific. In 1980, these two very similar species were differentiated by location—A. victoria was accepted as the variant in the Pacific while A. forskalea was designated for the variants of the Atlantic and Mediterranean.

== Distribution ==
While this pelagic species was originally discovered in offshore waters of the Mediterranean Sea, A. forskalea has been found in various suitable temperate and subtropical areas. This species is widely distributed, as they have been found in the Southwest Atlantic near northern Patagonia, along the west coast of Southern Africa, and from Galician waters stretching through the North Sea and up to the Norwegian Sea. Typically, this species is found in mid-continental shelf areas deeper than 150 meters (490 ft); however, there have been cases of blooms occurring in coastal regions as shallow as 100 meters (330 ft). This species is often found in waters measuring 13 to 22 °C (55 to 72 °F).

== Bioluminescence ==
Species of the genus Aequorea contain a bioluminescent protein (aequorin) and GFP (green fluorescent protein) discovered and studied extensively by Dr. Osamu Shimomura in 1961. While this initial research was done primarily with Aequorea victoria, further studies have identified, analyzed, and extracted aequorin and GFP from various Aequorea species including A. forskalea. To this day, A. victoria is still the primary species-of-interest for these extractions.
