= Aequorea macrodactyla =

Scientific classification
- Kingdom: Animalia
- Phylum: Cnidaria
- Class: Hydrozoa
- Order: Leptothecata
- Family: Aequoreidae
- Genus: Aequorea
- Species: A. macrodactyla

Binomial name
- Aequorea macrodactyla (Brandt, 1835)

Species of cnidarian

Aequorea macrodactyla is a species of hydrozoan in the family Aequoreidae. It was first described by Johann Friedrich von Brandt in 1835.

== Description ==
It can have up to 150 tentacles and grow up to 25 cm.

== Bioluminescence ==
The Bioluminescent system of A. macrodactyla is similar to a related species, Aequorea victoria; consisting of a 27-kDa Green fluorescent protein (GFP) and the Aequorin complex, the Luminophore Coelenterazine, and molecular oxygen. As calcium binds to coelenterazine, it oxidizes, resulting in the release of carbon dioxide and blue light. This blue light activates GFP causing it to emit a green light. Due to a difference in intron length in GFP, A. macrodactyla is brighter and bolder in color when compared with A. victoria.
