= Crystal jelly =

Crystal jelly or crystal jellyfish may refer to:

- Aequorea victoria, an American species
- Aequorea vitrina, a Northern European species
