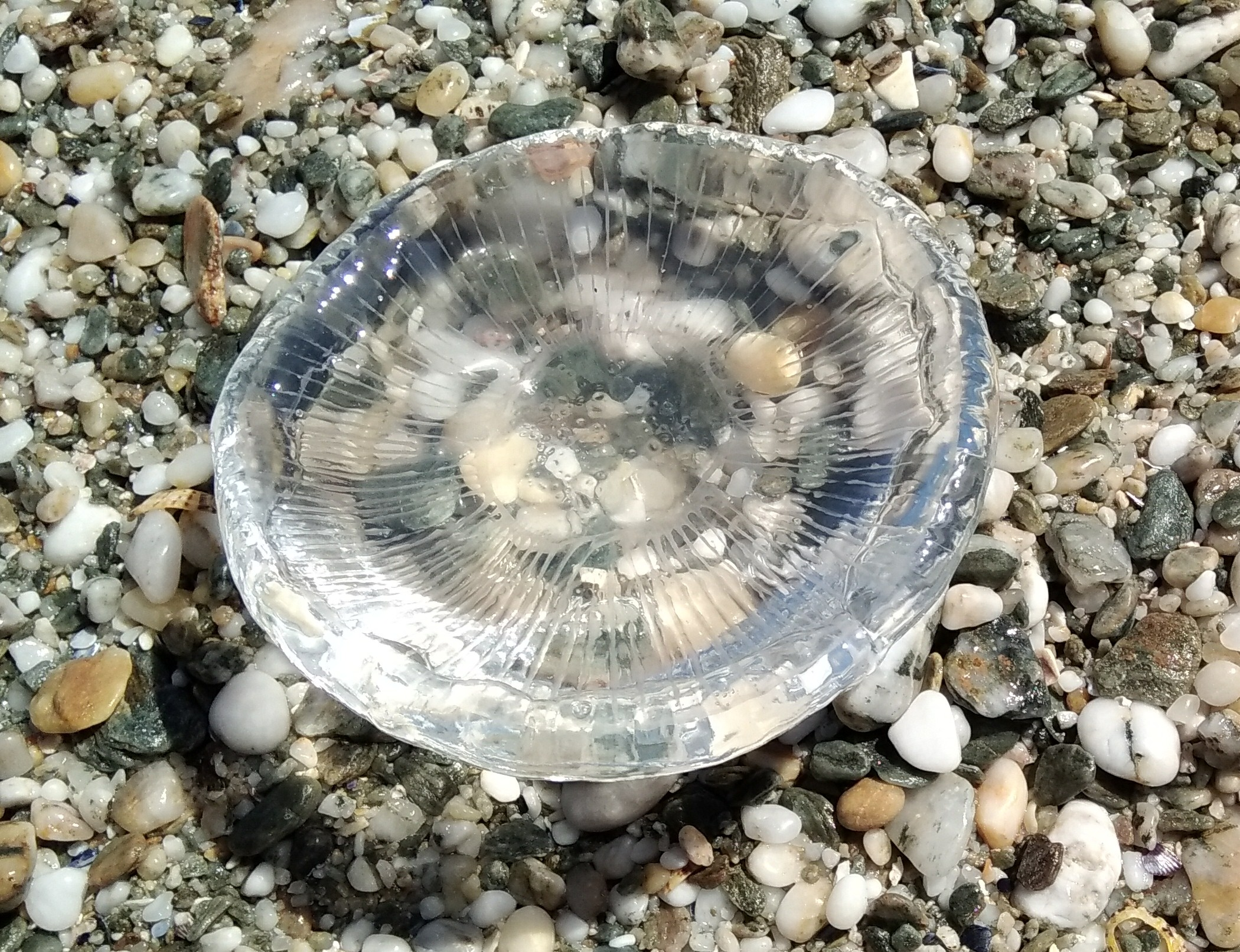

Scientific classification
- Kingdom: Animalia
- Phylum: Cnidaria
- Class: Hydrozoa
- Order: Leptothecata
- Family: Aequoreidae
- Genus: Aequorea
- Species: A. vitrina

Binomial name
- Aequorea vitrina Gosse, 1853

Synonyms
- Campanulina acuminata (Alder, 1857); Laomedea acuminata Alder, 1856; Polycanna vitrina (Gosse, 1853)

= Aequorea vitrina =

Species of hydrozoan

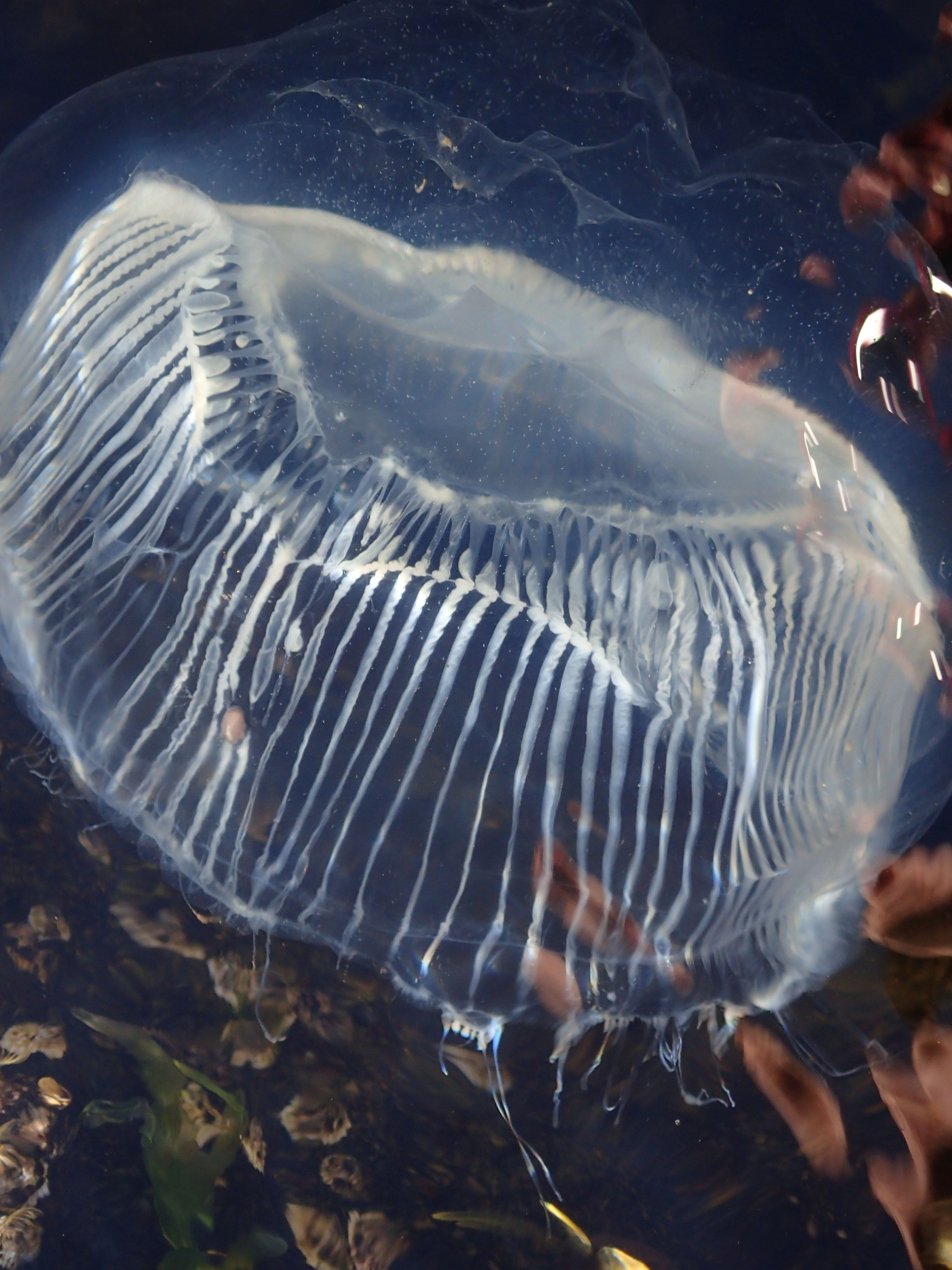
Showing the side ribs. The top is a little damaged here, but is very thick and completely clear.

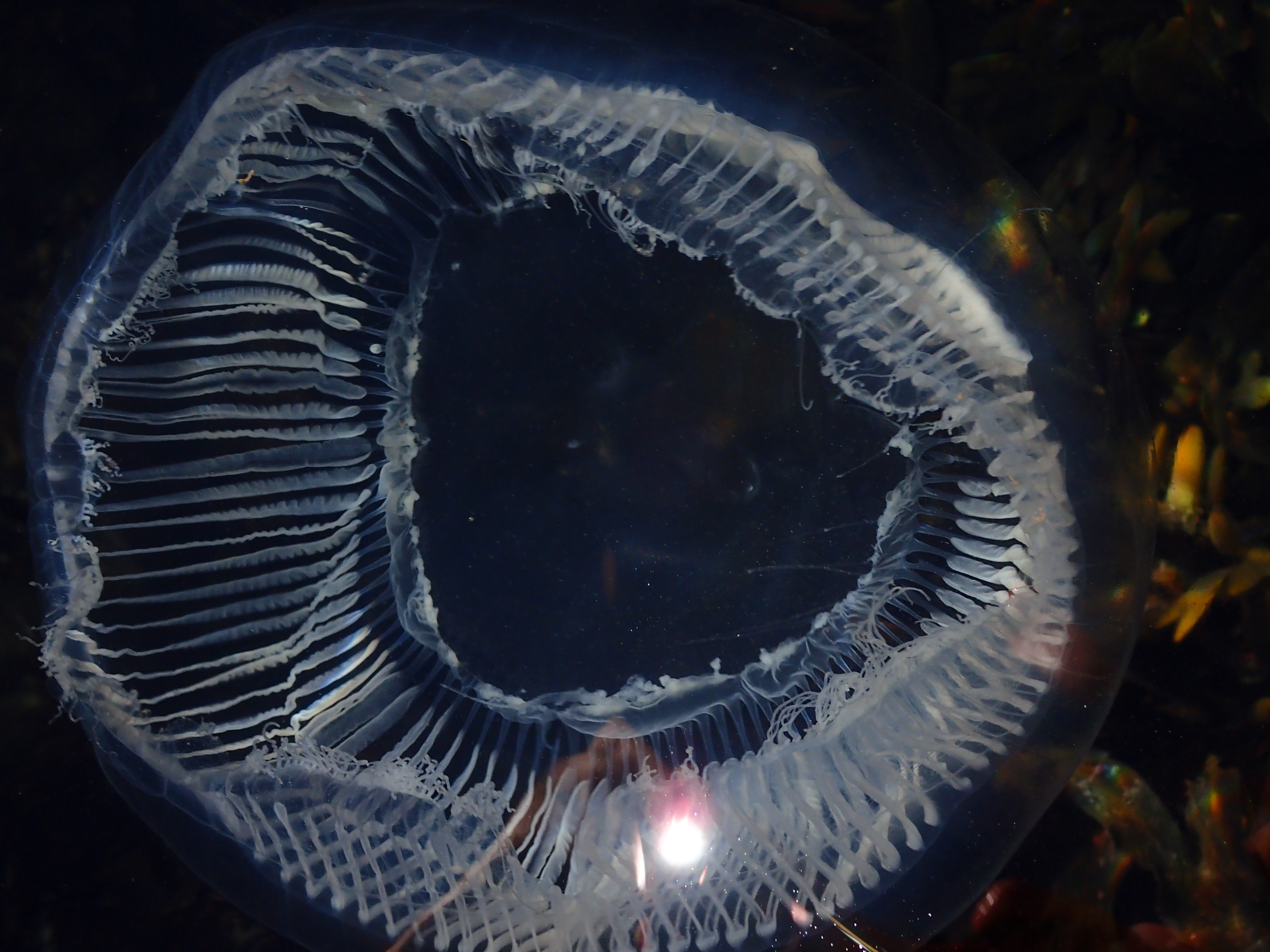
View from the underside. Note the large, clear "window"

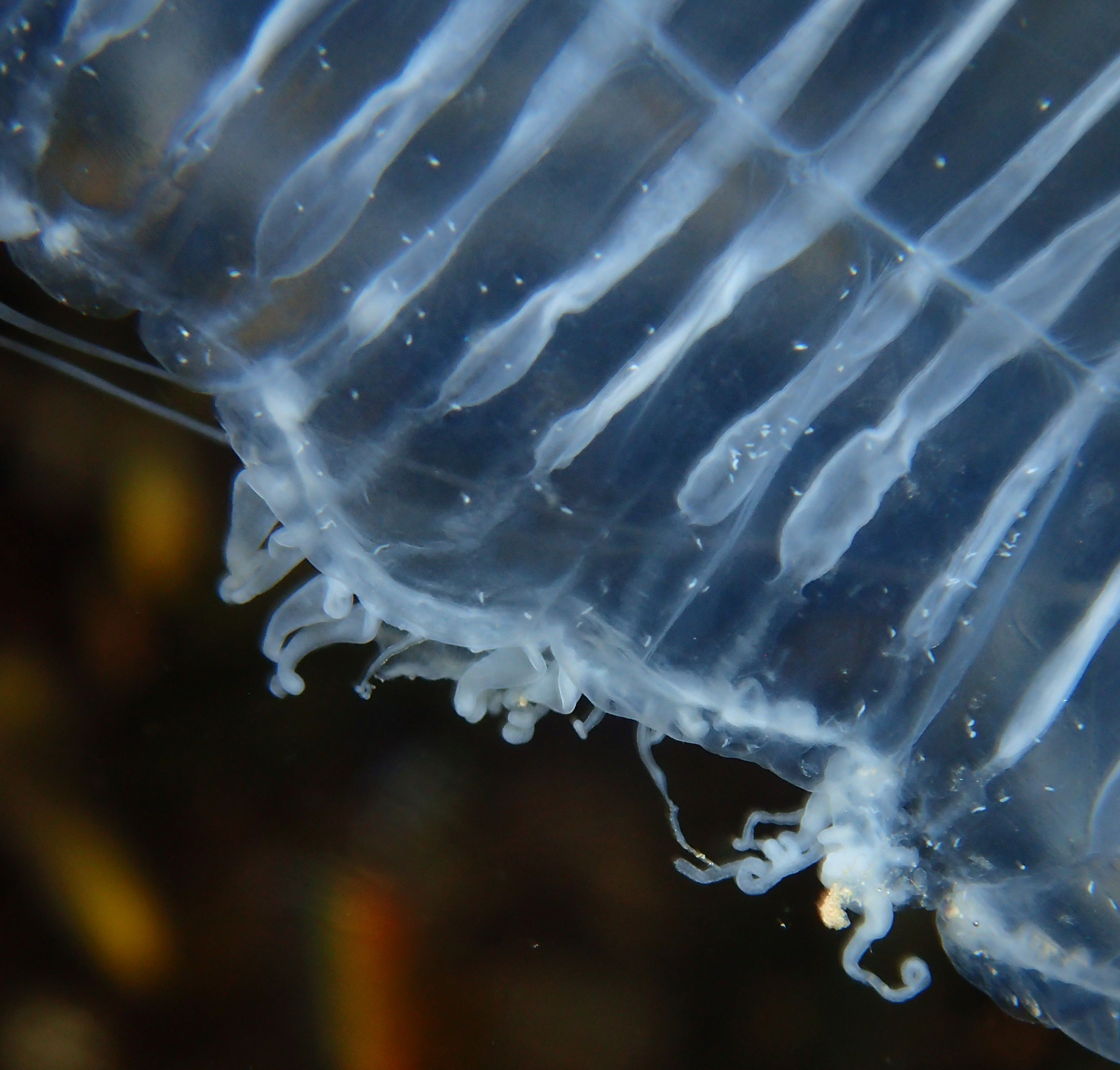
Detail of lower side edge showing the very short firing threads

Aequorea vitrina, commonly called the crystal jellyfish, crystal jelly, lampshade or disk jellyfish, is a species of hydrozoan in the family Aequoreidae.

The specific name vitrina means "glassy", due to its transparent appearance; it should not be confused with Aequorea victoria, which is also sometimes called the crystal jelly.

== Description ==
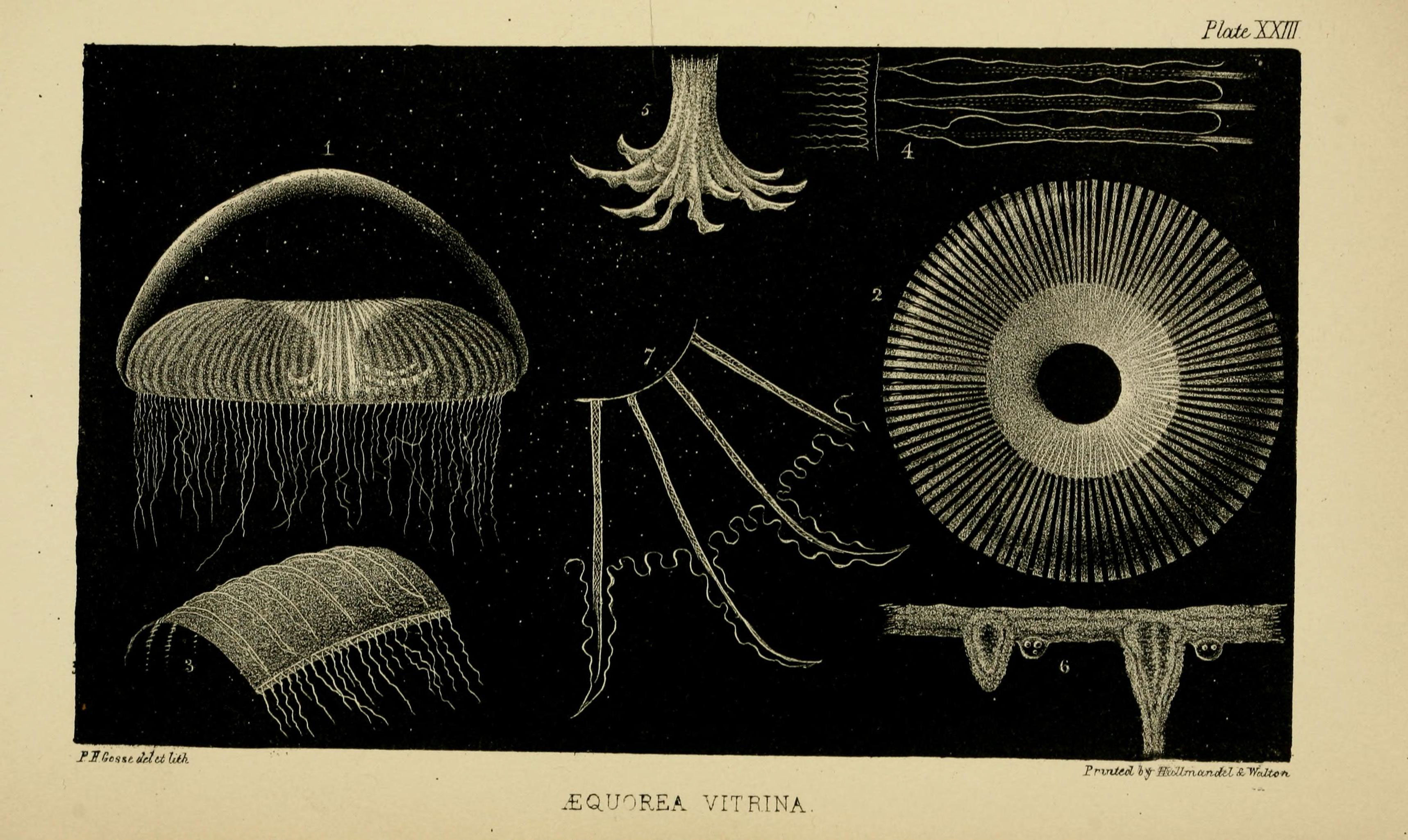
Lithograph of A. vitrina by its first describer, Philip Henry Gosse, 1853

Aequorea vitrina in its medusa (adult) stage has a diameter of 10–17 cm (3.9–6.7 in); thick in the centre, gradually thinning towards margin. Its stomach is about half the width of the disc. It has 60–100 radial canals, its gonads extend along almost their entire length. It has 200+ tentacles, of 50 cm (1.6 ft) or more, and 1 or 2 statocysts between radial canals.

== Distribution ==
Aequorea vitrina is found in the neritic zone in waters surrounding Great Britain and Ireland and in the North Sea. In 2017 it was recorded in the Sea of Marmara as an invasive species.

== Behaviour ==
Feeds on brine shrimp (Artemia salina) and rotifers (Brachionus plicatilis). It is bioluminescent due to aequorin and green fluorescent protein.
