= Rubis (sheep) =

Rubis (Note: Her name is sometimes translated as Ruby in English reports) was a sheep whose DNA contained green fluorescent protein, inherited from her genetically modified mother. She was sent to a slaughterhouse in mysterious circumstances and believed to have been eaten unknowingly.

== Background ==
In 2012, nine lambs were created with in vitro fertilisation, and then injected with genes containing a green fluorescent protein (GFP) from the aequorea victoria jellyfish. The lambs were born in October 2012.

The scientists who performed the experiment were from the Institute of Animal Reproduction in Uruguay and led by Alejo Menchaca. The experiment was part of larger research in gene modification, which hoped to find ways to treat genetic problems such as diabetes and haemophilia. While described as "glow in the dark" the lambs only glowed when exposed to ultraviolet light.

== Birth ==
One of the original lambs, Emeraude, gave birth in 2014 to a lamb named Rubis who also carried the GFP gene. However, while Rubis carried the gene, its traits were not visible in her, and so she did not glow.

== Disappearance ==
In August 2014, Rubis was sent to a Parisian slaughterhouse, along with other lambs that had not been genetically modified. Rubis' carcass was then sold by the slaughterhouse to an unknown person in November.

The Institute of Animal Reproduction believed she was transferred as a "malicious act by unknown employees" and agricultural minister Stéphane Le Foll called it a "deliberate act of malice." The case was investigated by a public health court in Paris.

It was later reported that a "disgruntled employee" who wanted to get his boss in trouble had his boss sign a delivery note for several lambs which had not been chosen for experiments, but including Rubis, to be sent to the slaughterhouse. Several days later, the boss realised what had happened but did not report the mistake.

== Response ==
The news caused worry in France because of general fears over genetically modified foods. GMF are particularly disliked in France, and have been banned since the early 2000s. Benoît Malpaux, the president of the Institute of Animal Reproduction said there would be no danger to the eater if Rubis was consumed.

== See also ==
- Dolly the sheep
