= Paul Brehm =

American biologist

Paul Brehm is a researcher at the Vollum Institute at Oregon Health and Science University. It was during a seminar by Brehm that Martin Chalfie became inspired to work on Green fluorescent protein for which Chalfie shared the Nobel Prize in Chemistry in 2008.

== Biography ==
He graduated in zoology from the University of Wisconsin–Madison and earned his Ph.D. UCLA focusing on marine biology and bioluminescence under James Morin. Postgraduate training with Roger Eckert at UCLA and Yoshi Kidokoro at the Salk Institute focused on calcium channels and synaptic transmission. The next 10 years were spent as an associate professor in physiology at Tufts Medical School and summers at the Marine Biological Laboratory at Woods Hole. In 1990 he moved to Stony Brook University where he served as professor of Neurobiology and Behavior before taking a position as Senior Scientist at the Vollum in 2007.
