= Tulle Hazelrigg =

American biologist

Tulle Inger Hazelrigg
- Education: Indiana University; Oberlin College
- Scientific career
- Workplaces: Columbia University; Carnegie Institution for Science; University of California, Berkeley; University of Utah
- Thesis: Cytogenetic properties and developmental functions of selected portions of the drosophila genome (1982)

Tulle Inger Hazelrigg is an American biologist and Professor of Cell Biology at Columbia University. Her research considers the propagation and differentiation of germ cells. Hazelrigg was the first to attach green fluorescent protein to other proteins, which changed the way biological research was conducted.

== Early life and education ==
Hazelrigg was born in Evansville and grew up in Bloomington, Indiana. She is the daughter of Hugh C. and Jane Yde Andersen Hazelrigg. Her father was the head science writer for the Indiana University news bureau. She became interested in science as a child and bred fruit flies in the basement of her house. She was encouraged by her father to complete her science fair projects in the laboratory of Hermann Joseph Muller, Nobel laureate and then geneticist at Indiana University Bloomington. She enrolled at an honorary science academy, but was kicked out because of her involvement in demonstrations against the war in Vietnam. She was an undergraduate student at Oberlin College, majoring in philosophy. Hazelrigg was unsure what to do after college and worked as a substitute teacher. She moved to Europe, where she took courses in art. She eventually returned to the United States and earned her doctorate at Indiana University Bloomington, where she worked under the supervision of Thomas Kaufman. She elucidated the fine structure of the Antennapedia complex. She was a postdoctoral researcher at the Carnegie Institution for Science and the University of California, Berkeley.

== Research and career ==
In 1986, Hazelrigg moved to the University of Utah, where she was appointed to the Howard Hughes Medical Institute. Hazelrigg was the first to attach green fluorescent protein to another protein, allowing her to track a protein's movement through living cells using the green fluorescent tag. She showed that the resulting green fluorescent protein fusion protein behaved the same way as the untagged protein. Green fluorescent protein fusion proteins allow for the study and localization of proteins in living cells. She joined the faculty at Columbia University in 1992.

Hazelrigg studies the propagation and differentiation of germ cells using the model organism Drosophila. Germ cells undergo a complex differentiation process and become male and female gametes. Hazelrigg has investigated how genes are regulated within germline stem cells and how this regulation is affected by differentiation. She discovered the histone-lysine methyltransferase dSETDB1, which is located in the pericentric heterochromatin and catalyzes the methylation of histone H3 at its K9 residue (H3K9). Without this gene, germline stem cells are not maintained in adult Drosophila in both the ovaries and the testes. She is investigating the gene targets of dSETDB1 and the mechanisms by which dSETDB1 identifies the targets in the genome.

In September 2019, Hazelrigg and her husband, Martin Chalfie, were awarded honorary degrees from Connecticut College.

== Selected publications ==
- Shengxian Wang; Tulle Hazelrigg (1 June 1994). "Implications for bcd mRNA localization from spatial distribution of exu protein in Drosophila oogenesis". Nature. 369 (6479): 400–403. doi:10.1038/369400a0. ISSN 1476-4687. PMID 7910952. Wikidata Q49101538.
- Matthew P. Scott; Amy J. Weiner; Tulle I. Hazelrigg; Barry A. Polisky; Vincenzo Pirrotta; Franco Scalenghe; Thomas C. Kaufman (1 December 1983). "The molecular organization of the Antennapedia locus of Drosophila". Cell. 35 (3 Pt 2): 763–776. doi:10.1016/0092-8674(83)90109-5. ISSN 0092-8674. PMID 6418389. Wikidata Q34709405.
- Tulle Hazelrigg; Robert Levis; Gerald M. Rubin (1 February 1984). "Transformation of white locus DNA in drosophila: dosage compensation, zeste interaction, and position effects". Cell. 36 (2): 469–481. doi:10.1016/0092-8674(84)90240-x. ISSN 0092-8674. PMID 6319027. Wikidata Q52519179.

== Personal life ==
In 1989, Hazelrigg married Martin Chalfie. Chalfie was awarded the 2008 Nobel Prize in Chemistry for the discovery and development of green fluorescent protein.
