= ANNINE-6plus =

Names
- Preferred IUPAC name 3-[10-(Dibutylamino)chryseno[2,1-f]isoquinolin-2-ium-2-yl]-N,N,N-trimethylpropan-1-aminium dibromide

Identifiers
CAS Number	1151942-85-6
3D model (JSmol)	Interactive image
ChemSpider	27473575
PubChem CID	71308153
UNII	ZSR3UB5RG2
CompTox Dashboard (EPA)	DTXSID20745426
- InChI: InChI=1S/C39H47N3.2BrH/c1-6-8-23-41(24-9-7-2)31-13-16-32-29(27-31)11-14-36-34(32)17-19-39-37-15-12-30-28-40(22-10-26-42(3,4)5)25-21-33(30)35(37)18-20-38(36)39;;/h11-21,25,27-28H,6-10,22-24,26H2,1-5H3;2*1H/q+2;;/p-2 Key: LGXPDFMRHWKUGJ-UHFFFAOYSA-L; InChI=1/C39H47N3.2BrH/c1-6-8-23-41(24-9-7-2)31-13-16-32-29(27-31)11-14-36-34(32)17-19-39-37-15-12-30-28-40(22-10-26-42(3,4)5)25-21-33(30)35(37)18-20-38(36)39;;/h11-21,25,27-28H,6-10,22-24,26H2,1-5H3;2*1H/q+2;;/p-2 Key: LGXPDFMRHWKUGJ-NUQVWONBAZ
- SMILES: C[N+](C)(C)CCC[N+]1=CC(C=C2)=C(C=C1)C3=C2C(C=C4)=C(C=C3)C5=C4C6=CC=C(N(CCCC)CCCC)C=C6C=C5.[Br-].[Br-]

Properties
Chemical formula	C_{39}H_{47}Br_{2}N_{3}
Molar mass	717.634 g·mol^{−1}
- Except where otherwise noted, data are given for materials in their standard state (at 25 °C [77 °F], 100 kPa). Infobox references

ANNINE-6plus is a water soluble voltage sensitive dye (also called potentiometric dyes). This compound was developed at the Max Planck Institute for Biochemistry in Germany. It is used to optically measure the changes in transmembrane voltage of excitable cells, including neurons, skeletal and cardiac myocytes.

== Voltage sensitivity ==
ANNINE-6plus has a fractional fluorescent intensity change (ΔF/F per 100 mV change) of about 30% with single-photon excitation (~488 nm) and >50% with two-photon excitation (~1060 nm).

== Applications ==
ANNINE-6plus has been applied in the microscopic imaging of action potentials of cardiomyocyte in perfused mice heart. Using confocal microscopy in conjunction with ANNINE-6plus, single sweep action potentials with high peak signal-to-noise ratio (SNR) have been recorded from single transverse tubule (t-tubule) of a few micrometers in the ventricular cardiomyocyte.
