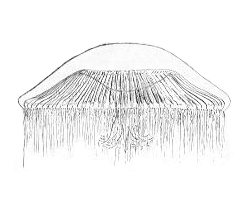

Scientific classification
- Kingdom: Animalia
- Phylum: Cnidaria
- Class: Hydrozoa
- Order: Leptothecata
- Family: Aequoreidae
- Genus: Rhacostoma; L. Agassiz, 1850
- Species: R. atlanticum

Binomial name
- Rhacostoma atlanticum L. Agassiz, 1850

= Rhacostoma =

Genus of hydrozoans

Rhacostoma is a genus of aequoreid hydrozoans. It is monotypic with a single species, Rhacostoma atlanticum Or Lined Water Jellyfish. It has been reported from the Atlantic coastline of North America, Colombia, western and central Africa. The polyp stage is stolonal, with a tubular hydrotheca and 15 moniliform tentacles when completely extend.

== Morphology ==
The medusae reach up to 30–40 cm (12–16 in) in diameter with the bell height 3–4 times less than the width. Specimens found in the northern waters tend to be transparent, while those found further south are tinted pink. The broad stomach gives rise to 80–100 non-branching radial canals. Tentacles are slightly more numerous than radial canals and possess elongated conical bulbs.
