= Aequorea tenuis =

Scientific classification
- Domain: Eukaryota
- Kingdom: Animalia
- Phylum: Cnidaria
- Class: Hydrozoa
- Order: Leptothecata
- Family: Aequoreidae
- Genus: Aequorea
- Species: A. tenuis

Binomial name
- Aequorea tenuis (A. Agassiz, 1862)

Species of hydrozoan

Aequorea tenuis, or the flat jellyfish, is a species of hydrozoan found off the coastline of mainland North America. It reaches only two inches in diameter, with more than eighty fine tentacles. As with several other species of Aequorea, these jellyfish bioluminesce from the base of their tentacles when disturbed.
