= Yoshimasa Hirata =

Japanese organic chemist

- 平田 義正
- Born: 1915; Yamaguchi, Japan
- Died: March 5, 2000 (aged 84–85)
- Citizenship: Japanese
- Education: Tokyo Imperial University; Nagoya University
- Awards: Japan Academy Prize; Order of the Sacred Treasure, 2nd Class; Person of Cultural Merit
- Scientific career
- Fields: Organic chemistry
- Workplaces: Nagoya University; Meijo University
- Thesis: キノコの抗菌性物質グリフォリンに就いて (1949)
- Doctoral advisor: Fujio Egami
- Doctoral students: Koji Nakanishi; Yoshito Kishi
- Other notable students: Osamu Shimomura

Yoshimasa Hirata (平田 義正, Hirata Yoshimasa; 1915 – 5 March 2000) was a Japanese organic chemist.

== Biography ==
Hirata was born in Yamaguchi, Japan in 1915. He received a Bachelor of Science from the Tokyo Imperial University (now the University of Tokyo) in 1941, and then joined the faculty there as a Lecturer of Chemistry. In 1944, he moved to Nagoya University as an Assistant Professor in the Department of Chemistry. In that same year, he was promoted Associate Professor. He received his Ph.D. from Nagoya University in 1949, and was promoted to Full Professor in 1954.

In 1955, Hirata met a recent graduate from Nagasaki Pharmacy School, a young Osamu Shimomura. He invited Shimomura to work in his lab, which he did, in April 1955. Hirata tasked him with purifying crystallizing Cypridina luciferin for the purpose of determining its structure. He completed the difficult task after three months, and Hirata awarded him with a doctorate, despite him not being a doctoral student.

In 1979, Hirata moved to Meijo University, staying there for ten years before retiring.

== Research ==
Hirata's best known research was that involving toxic compounds, including tetrodotoxinpandalytoxin, his research of the bioluminescent compound Cypridina luciferin from the vargula hilgendorfii, also known as the sea firefly, and his work on bioactive compounds of plant origin, including anisatin, dendrobine, and daphniphylline.

== Awards and honors ==
- 1941 Chunichi Culture Prize
- 1965 Asahi Prize
- 1965 Chemical Society of Japan Award
- 1977 Japan Academy Prize
- 1977 Fujihara Award
- 1987 Order of the Sacred Treasure, 2nd Class
- 1990 Person of Cultural Merit
- 1996 Nakanishi Prize
- 2000 Order of the Rising Sun
