= Osamu Shimomura =

Japanese organic chemist and marine biologist (1928–2018)

- 下村 脩
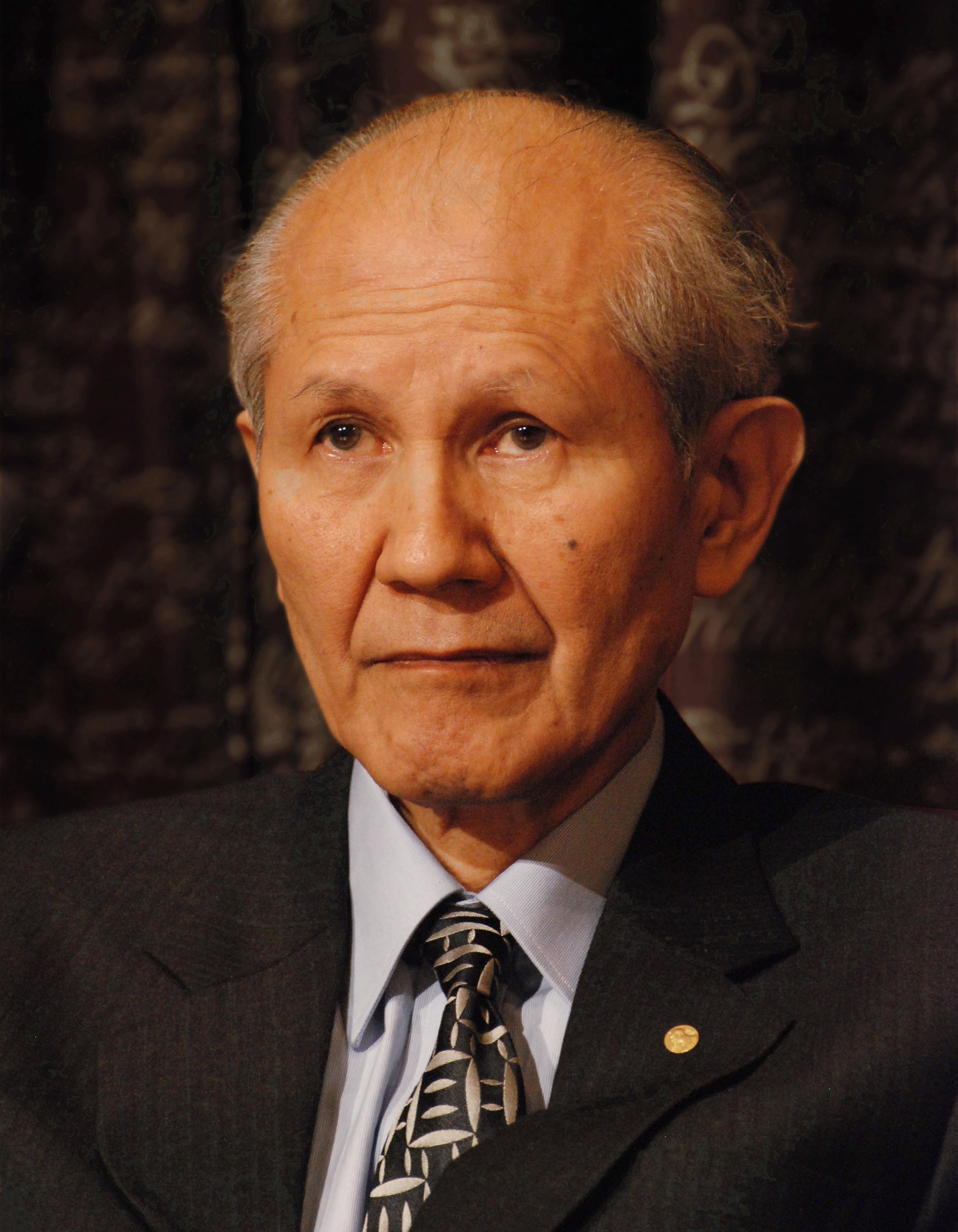
- Shimomura in 2008
- Born: August 27, 1928; Fukuchiyama, Empire of Japan
- Died: October 19, 2018 (aged 90); Nagasaki, Japan
- Education: Nagasaki University; Nagoya University
- Children: Tsutomu Shimomura
- Awards: Pearse Prize (2004); Asahi Prize (2006); Nobel Prize in Chemistry (2008); Golden Goose Award (2012)
- Scientific career
- Fields: Organic chemistry
- Workplaces: Princeton University; Boston University School of Medicine; Marine Biological Laboratory
- Thesis: 海ホタルルシフェリンの構造 (1960)
- Doctoral advisor: Yoshimasa Hirata

Osamu Shimomura (下村 脩, Shimomura Osamu; August 27, 1928 – October 19, 2018) was a Japanese organic chemist and marine biologist, and professor emeritus at Marine Biological Laboratory (MBL) in Woods Hole, Massachusetts and Boston University School of Medicine. He was awarded the Nobel Prize in Chemistry in 2008 for the discovery and development of green fluorescent protein (GFP) with two American scientists: Martin Chalfie of Columbia University and Roger Tsien of the University of California-San Diego.

== Biography ==
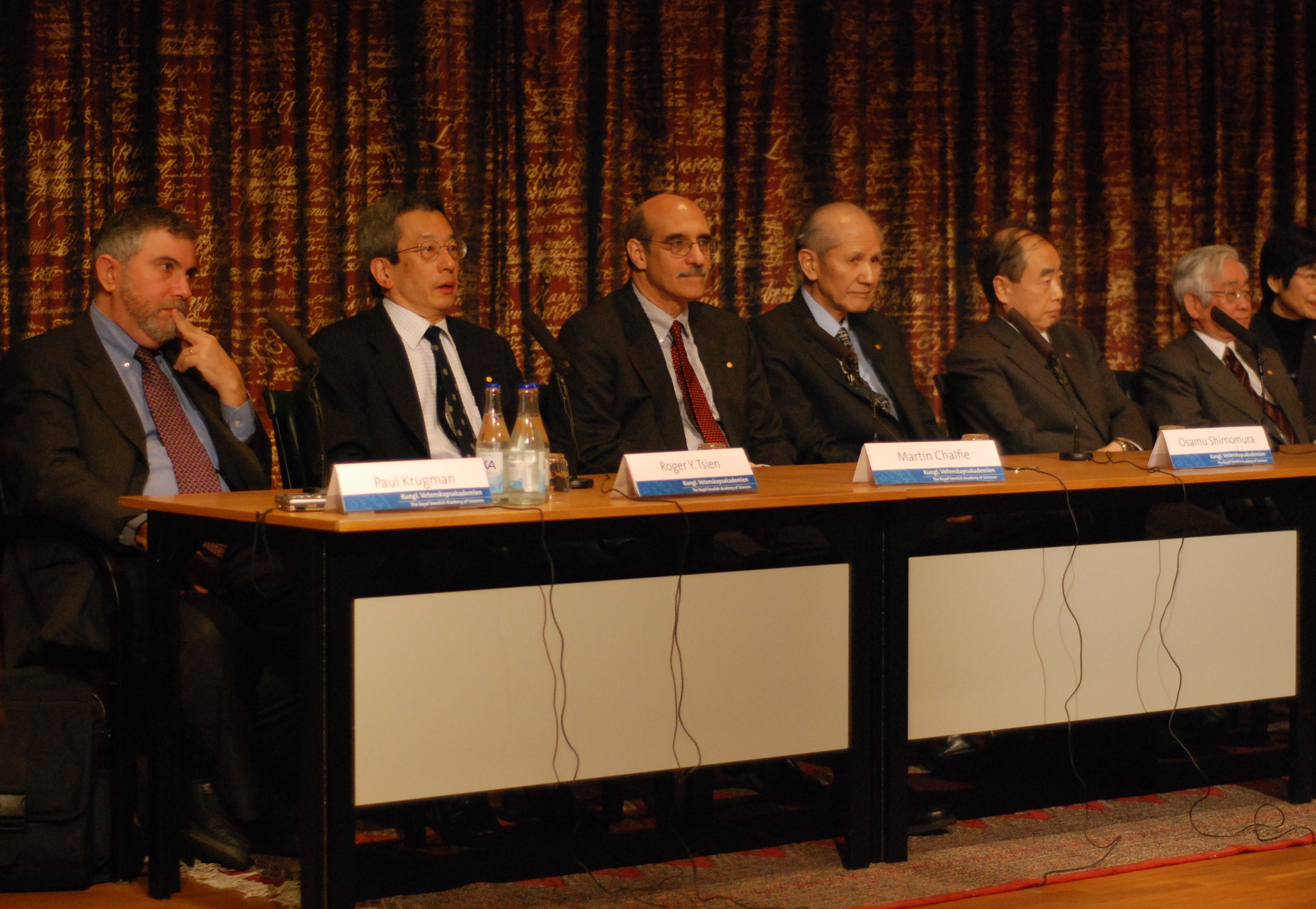
Paul Krugman, Roger Tsien, Martin Chalfie, Osamu Shimomura, Makoto Kobayashi and Toshihide Masukawa, Nobel Prize Laureates 2008, at a press conference at the Swedish Academy of Science in Stockholm.

Born in Fukuchiyama, Kyoto in 1928, Shimomura was brought up in Manchukuo (Manchuria, China) and Osaka, Japan while his father served as an officer in the Imperial Japanese Army. Later, his family moved to Isahaya, Nagasaki, 25 km from the epicenter of the August 1945 atomic bombing of the city. He recalled hearing, as a 16-year-old boy, the bomber plane Bockscar before the atom bomb exploded. The explosion flash blinded Shimomura for about thirty seconds, and he was later drenched by the "black rain" bomb fallout. He overcame great odds in the following 11 years to earn an education and achieve academic success.

Shimomura's education opportunities were starkly limited in devastated, post-war Japan. Although he later recalled having no interest in the subject, he enrolled in the College of Pharmaceutical Sciences of Nagasaki Medical College (now Nagasaki University School of Pharmaceutical Sciences). The Medical College campus had been entirely destroyed by the atomic bomb blast, forcing the pharmacy school to relocate to a temporary campus near Shimomura's home. This proximity was the fortuitous reason he embarked upon the studies and career which would ultimately lead to unanticipated rewards. Shimomura was awarded a BS degree in pharmacy in 1951, and he stayed on as a lab assistant through 1955.

Shimomura's mentor at Nagasaki helped him find employment as an assistant to Professor Yoshimasa Hirata at Nagoya University in 1956. While working for Professor Hirata, he received a MS degree in organic chemistry in 1958 and, before leaving Japan for an appointment at Princeton University, a Ph.D. in organic chemistry in 1960 at Nagoya University. At Nagoya, Hirata assigned Shimomura the challenging task of determining what made the crushed remains of a type of crustacean (Jp. umi-hotaru, lit. "sea-firefly", Vargula hilgendorfii) glow when moistened with water. This assignment led Shimomura to the successful identification of the protein causing the phenomenon, and he published the preliminary findings in the Bulletin of the Chemical Society of Japan in a paper titled "Crystalline Cypridina luciferin." The article caught the attention of Professor Frank Johnson at Princeton University, and Johnson successfully recruited Shimomura to work with him in 1960.

== Studies ==
Shimomura worked in the department of biology at Princeton for Professor Johnson to study the bioluminescent jellyfish Aequorea victoria, which they collected during many summers at the Friday Harbor Laboratories of the University of Washington. In 1962, their work culminated in the discovery of the proteins aequorin and green fluorescent protein (GFP) in A. victoria; for this work, he was awarded a third of the Nobel Prize in Chemistry in 2008.

== Family ==
His wife, Akemi, whom Shimomura met at Nagasaki University, is also an organic chemist and was a partner in his research activities. Their son, Tsutomu Shimomura, is a computer security expert who was involved in the arrest of Kevin Mitnick. Their daughter, Sachi Shimomura, is director of Undergraduate Studies for the English Department at Virginia Commonwealth University and the author of Odd Bodies and Visible Ends in Medieval Literature.

== Death ==
Shimomura died on October 19, 2018, of cancer in Nagasaki.

== Recognition ==
- 2004 – Pearse Prize, Royal Microscopical Society
- 2005 – Emile Chamot Award
- 2006 – Asahi Prize
- 2008 – Nobel Prize in Chemistry
- 2008 – Order of Culture
- 2008 – Person of Cultural Merit
- 2012 – Golden Goose Award
- 2013 – Member of the United States National Academy of Sciences
- 2018 – Junior third rank (posthumous)

== Selected publications ==
Books

- Bioluminescence: Chemical Principles And Methods (Revised ed.). World Scientific Publishing Company. 2012. ISBN 978-981-4366-08-3.
- クラゲに学ぶ : ノーベル賞への道 [Learning from Jellyfish: The Path to the Nobel Prize] (in Japanese). Nagasaki Literature. 2010. ISBN 978-4-88851-157-5.

Papers

- Yasanuga, Shungo; Shimomura, Osamu (July 1954). 無機クロマトグラフィーに関する研究 (第6報):滬紙通電クロマトグラフィーの装置について [Studies on Inorganic Chromatography (Part 6): Apparatus for Electrochromatography on Paper]. Journal of the Pharmaceutical Society of Japan. 74 (7): 778–780. doi:10.1248/yakushi1947.74.7_778. ISSN 0031-6903.
- Shimomura, Osamu (1955). 口紙電気泳動に関する研究 (第3報) 難溶性塩および錯イオンの生成時における濃度-泳動度曲線について [Study on Oral Electrophoresis (Part 3) Concentration-Magnetic Mobility Curves in Formation of Poorly Soluble Salts and Complex Ions]. Chemistry Journal of Japan. 76 (9): 973–977. doi:10.1246/nikkashi1948.76.973. ISSN 0369-5387.
- Shimomura, Osamu (1955). アニリン誘導体およびフェエノール誘導体のロ紙電気泳動について [Study on Oral Electrophoresis of Aniline Derivatives and Phenol Derivatives]. Chemistry Journal of Japan. 76 (3): 277–281. doi:10.1246/nikkashi1948.76.277.
- Hirata, Yoshimasa; Eguchi, Shoji; Shimomura, Osamu (October 17, 1959). 海ホタルルシフェリンの構造 [Structure of Sea Firefly Luciferin]. Proceedings of the Symposium on Natural Organic Compounds. 3: 83–93. doi:10.24496/tennenyuki.3.0_83.
- Shimomura, Osamu (1960). 海ホタルルシフェリンの構造(第2～3報) (第2報)海ホタルルシフェリンの性質および分子式について [Structure of Sea Firefly Luciferin (Part 2–3) (Part 2) Properties and Molecular Formula of Sea Firefly Luciferin]. Chemistry Journal of Japan. 81 (1): 179–182. doi:10.1246/nikkashi1948.81.179.
- Shimomura, Osamu (1960). 海ホタルルシフェリンの構造(第2～3報) (第3報)海ホタルルシフェリンおよびヒドロルシフェリンの推定構造 [Structure of Sea Firefly Luciferin (Parts 2–3) (Part 3) Predicted Structures of Sea Firefly Luciferin and Hydroluciferin]. Chemistry Journal of Japan. 81 (1): 182–185. doi:10.1246/nikkashi1948.81.182.
- 緑色蛍光たんぱく質GFPは天の恵みか? [Is green fluorescent protein GFP a godsend?]. Acta Anatomica Nipponica. 85 (3). September 1, 2010. 99-106.

== See also ==
- List of Japanese Nobel laureates
- Kamo Aquarium

== Sources ==
- Osamu Shimomura on Nobelprize.org including the Nobel lecture Discovery of Green Fluorescent Protein, GFP
