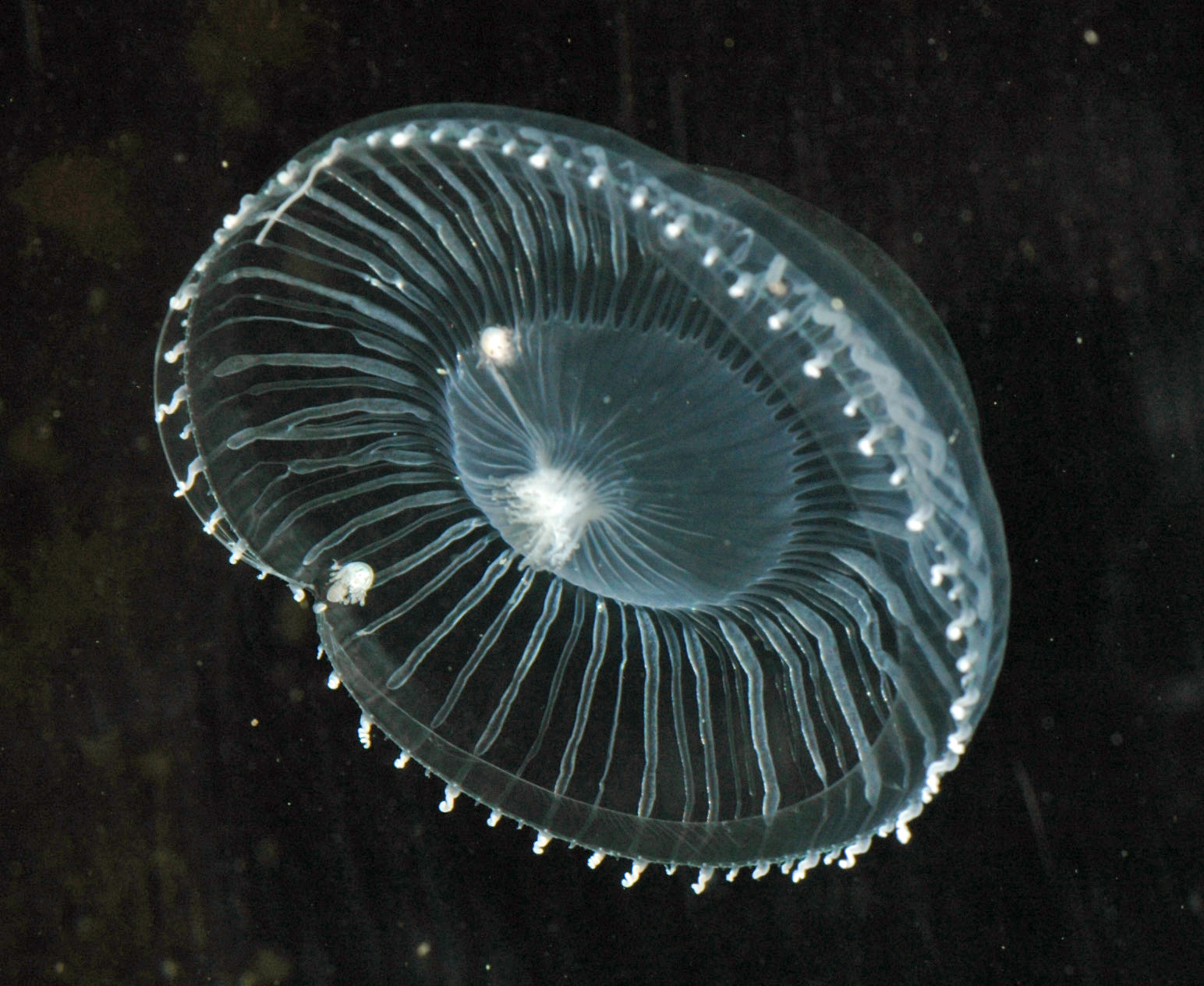
- Aequorea victoria (the "crystal jelly") with two amphipods

Scientific classification
- Kingdom: Animalia
- Phylum: Cnidaria
- Class: Hydrozoa
- Order: Leptothecata
- Family: Aequoreidae
- Genus: Aequorea; Péron & Lesueur, 1810

= Aequorea =

Genus of cnidarians

Crystal Jelly (Aequorea sp) swimming

Aequorea is a genus of pelagic hydrozoans in the family Aequoreidae.

== Species ==
The genus contains the following species:

- Aequorea africana Millard, 1966
- Aequorea albida L. Agassiz, 1862
- Aequorea atrikeelis Lin, Xu, Huang & Wang, 2009
- Aequorea australis Uchida, 1947
- Aequorea coerulescens (Brandt, 1838)
- Aequorea conica Browne, 1905
- Aequorea cyanea de Blainville, 1834
- Aequorea floridana Agassiz, 1862
- Aequorea forskalea Péron & Lesueur, 1810
- Aequorea globosa Eschscholtz, 1829
- Aequorea krampi Bouillon, 1984
- Aequorea kurangai Gershwin, Zeidler & Davie, 2010
- Aequorea macrodactyla Brandt, 1835
- Aequorea minima Bouillon, 1985
- Aequorea nanhainensis Xu, Huang & Du, 2009
- Aequorea papillata Huang & Xu, 1994
- Aequorea parva Browne, 1905
- Aequorea pensilis Haeckel, 1879
- Aequorea phillipensis Watson, 1998
- Aequorea taiwanensis Zheng, Lin, Li, Cao, Xu & Huang, 2009
- Aequorea tenuis Agassiz, 1862
- Aequorea tetranema Xu, Huang & Du, 2009
- Aequorea victoria Murbach & Shearer, 1902
- Aequorea vitrina Gosse, 1853
