= Aequorin =

Calcium-activated photoprotein

Aequorin 1
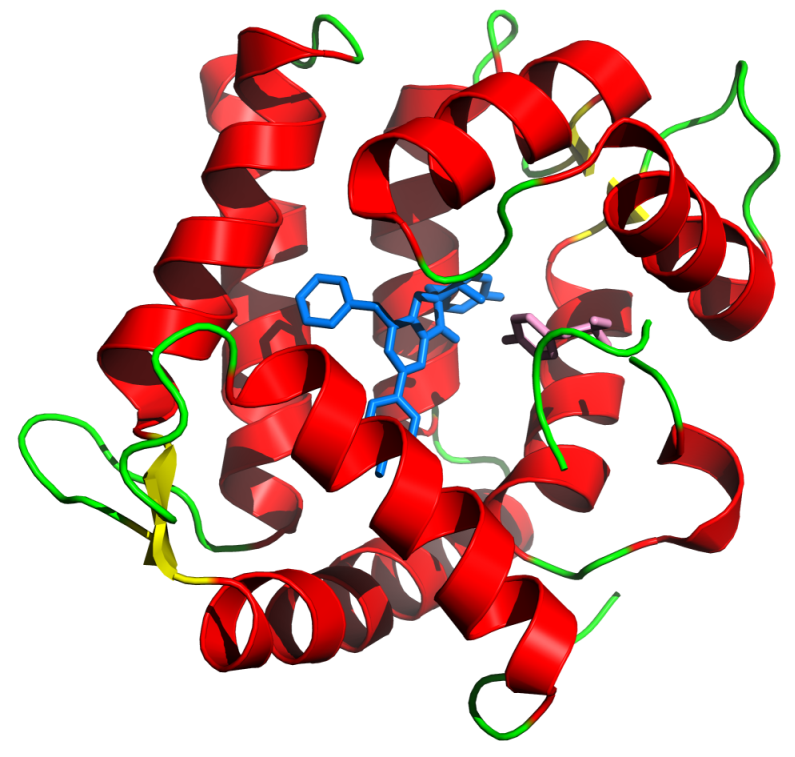
- Aequorin ribbon diagram from PDB 1ej3 with prosthetic group coelenterazine in blue

Identifiers
- Organism: Aequorea victoria (Jellyfish)
- Symbol: N/A
- Orthologs: OMA: entry
- UniProt: P07164

Other data
- EC number: 1.13.12.5
Search for
- Structures: Swiss-model
- Domains: InterPro

Aequorin is a calcium-activated photoprotein isolated from the hydrozoan Aequorea victoria. Its bioluminescence was studied decades before the protein was isolated from the animal by Osamu Shimomura in 1962. In the animal, the protein occurs together with the green fluorescent protein to produce green light by resonant energy transfer, while aequorin by itself generates blue light.

Discussions of "jellyfish DNA" that can make "glowing" animals often refer to transgenic animals that express the green fluorescent protein, not aequorin, although both originally derive from the same animal.

Apoaequorin, the protein portion of aequorin, is an ingredient in the dietary supplement Prevagen. The US Federal Trade Commission (FTC) has charged the maker with false advertising for its memory improvement claims.

== Discovery ==
Work on aequorin began with E. Newton Harvey in 1921. Though Harvey was unable to demonstrate a classical luciferase-luciferin reaction, he showed that water could produce light from dried photocytes and that light could be produced even in the absence of oxygen. Later, Osamu Shimomura began work into the bioluminescence of Aequorea in 1961. This involved tedious harvesting of tens of thousands of jellyfish from the docks in Friday Harbor, Washington. It was determined that light could be produced from extracts with seawater, and more specifically, with calcium. It was also noted during the extraction the animal creates green light due to the presence of the green fluorescent protein, which changes the native blue light of aequorin to green.

While the main focus of his work was on the bioluminescence, Shimomura and two others, Martin Chalfie and Roger Tsien, were awarded the Nobel Prize in 2008 for their work on green fluorescent proteins.

== Structure ==
Aequorin is a holoprotein composed of two distinct units, the apoprotein that is called apoaequorin, which has an approximate molecular weight of 21 kDa, and the prosthetic group coelenterazine, the luciferin. This is to say, apoaequorin is the enzyme produced in the photocytes of the animal, and coelenterazine is the substrate whose oxidation the enzyme catalyzes. When coelenterazine is bound, it is called aequorin. The protein contains three EF hand motifs that function as binding sites for Ca^{2+} ions. The protein is a member of the superfamily of the calcium-binding proteins, of which there are some 66 subfamilies.

The crystal structure revealed that aequorin binds coelenterazine and oxygen in the form of a peroxide, coelenterazine-2-hydroperoxide. The binding site for the first two calcium atoms show a 20 times greater affinity for calcium than the third site. However, earlier claims that only two EF-hands bind calcium were questioned when later structures indicated that all three sites can indeed bind calcium. Thus, titration studies show that all three calcium-binding sites are active but only two ions are needed to trigger the enzymatic reaction.

Other studies have shown the presence of an internal cysteine bond that maintains the structure of aequorin. This has also explained the need for a thiol reagent like beta mercaptoethanol in the regeneration of the protein since such reagents weaken the sulfhydryl bonds between cysteine residues, expediting the regeneration of the aequorin.

Chemical characterization of aequorin indicates the protein is somewhat resilient to harsh treatments. Aequorin is heat resistant. Held at 95 °C for 2 minutes the protein lost only 25% activity. Denaturants such as 6-M urea or 4-M guanidine hydrochloride did not destroy the protein.

== Genetics ==
Aequorin is presumably encoded in the genome of Aequorea. At least four copies of the gene were recovered as cDNA from the animal. Because the genome has not been sequenced, it is unclear if the cDNA variants can account for all of the isoforms of the protein.

== Mechanism of action ==
Early studies of the bioluminescence of Aequorea by E. Newton Harvey had noted that the bioluminescence appears as a ring around the bell, and occurs even in the absence of air. This was remarkable because most bioluminescence reactions require oxygen, and led to the idea that the animals somehow store oxygen. It was later discovered that the apoprotein can stably bind coelenterazine-2-hydroperoxide, and oxygen is required for the regeneration to this active form of aequorin. However, in the presence of calcium ions, the protein undergoes a conformational change and converts its prosthetic group, coelenterazine-2-hydroperoxide, into excited coelenteramide and CO_{2}. As the excited coelenteramide relaxes to the ground state, blue light (wavelength of 465 nm) is emitted. Before coelenteramide is exchanged out, the entire protein is still fluorescent blue. because of the connection between bioluminescence and fluorescence, this property was ultimately important in the discovery of the luciferin coelenterazine.

== Applications ==
Since the emitted light can be easily detected with a luminometer, aequorin has become a useful tool in molecular biology for the measurement of intracellular Ca^{2+} levels. The early successful purification of aequorin led to the first experiments involving the injection of the protein into the tissues of living animals to visualize the physiological release of calcium in the muscle fibers of a barnacle. Since then, the protein has been widely used in many model biological systems, including zebrafish, rats, mice, and cultured cells.

Cultured cells expressing the aequorin gene can effectively synthesize apoaequorin; however, recombinant expression yields only the apoprotein. Therefore it is necessary to add coelenterazine into the culture medium of the cells to obtain a functional protein and thus use its blue light emission to measure Ca^{2+} concentration. Coelenterazine is a hydrophobic molecule, and therefore is easily taken up across plant and fungal cell walls, as well as the plasma membrane of higher eukaryotes, making aequorin suitable as a Ca^{2+} reporter in plants, fungi, and mammalian cells.

Aequorin has a number of advantages over other Ca^{2+} indicators. Because the protein is large, it has a low leakage rate from cells compared to lipophilic dyes such as DiI. It lacks phenomena of intracellular compartmentalization or sequestration as is often seen for Voltage-sensitive dyes, and does not disrupt cell functions or embryo development. Moreover, the light emitted by the oxidation of coelenterazine does not depend on any optical excitation, so problems with auto-fluorescence are eliminated. The primary limitation of aequorin is that the prosthetic group coelenterazine is irreversibly consumed to produce light, and requires continuous addition of coelenterazine into the media. Such issues led to developments of other genetically encoded calcium sensors including the calmodulin-based sensor cameleon, developed by Roger Tsien and the troponin-based sensor, TN-XXL, developed by Oliver Griesbeck.

== Marketing and legal challenges ==
Apoaequorin is an ingredient in Prevagen, which is marketed by Quincy Bioscience as a memory supplement. In 2017, the US Federal Trade Commission (FTC) charged the maker with falsely advertising that the product improves memory, provides cognitive benefits, and is "clinically shown" to work. According to the FTC, "the marketers of Prevagen preyed on the fears of older consumers experiencing age-related memory loss". Quincy said that it would fight the charges.

Prior to the suit, a clinical trial run by researchers employed by Quincy Bioscience "found no overall benefit compared to a placebo for its primary endpoints involving memory and cognition", while the company's advertising misleadingly cited a few contested subgroup analyses that showed slight improvements.

The suit (Spath, et al. v. Quincy Bioscience Holding Company, Inc., et al., Case No. 18-cv-12416, D. NJ.) was dismissed in the District court, but an appeal seeking to overturn the dismissal was filed. The suit was consolidated with another against Quincy Pharmaceuticals, Vanderwerff v. Quincy Bioscience (Case No. 17-cv-784, D. NJ), which was the lead case.

On February 21, 2019, the United States Court of Appeals for the Second Circuit ruled that the FTC and the state of New York could proceed with their lawsuit against Quincy Bioscience for its claims that Prevagen can improve memory. The order came less than two weeks after the parties argued the case before a three-judge panel of the circuit, where company lawyers admitted they did not "dispute that if you look across the entire 211 people who completed the study there was no statistically significant difference". The court vigorously dismissed allegations by the company lawyers that the FTC pursued its action for political reasons.

On March 23, 2020, a federal magistrate judge in the United States District Court for the Southern District of Florida entered a report and recommendations certifying a nationwide class action for the class of consumers who purchased Prevagen over the previous four years. The trial in the case was set for October 2020.

As of September 21, 2020, Quincy Bioscience agreed to settle the claims that it misrepresented its Prevagen products as supporting brain health and helping with memory loss. Under the terms of the settlement, eligible purchasers applying by October 26, 2020, for purchases made from 2007 through July 31, 2020, could recover refunds of up to $70.

Dr. Harriet Hall, writing for Science-Based Medicine, noted that the Quincy-sponsored study (known as "Madison Memory Study") was negative, but that the company utilized p-hacking to find favorable results. She wrote that their cited safety studies were all rat studies and their claim that apoaequorin crosses the blood–brain barrier was based solely on a dog study. The American Pharmacists Association warns that Apoaequorin "is unlikely to be absorbed to a significant degree; instead it degrades into amino acids".

On April 3, 2025, Quincy Bioscience, who was a co-plaintiff with Amazon, won a lawsuit against several sellers of counterfeit Prevagen on the Amazon website. A Washington federal judge awarded a combined total of $1,895,375.40 in default judgments.

Prevagen is purported to be a target for theft in retail stores by organized retail crime groups. Several factors contribute to it being a popular target, including its price, demand, and marketing claims around its effectiveness. On April 24, 2020, The U.S. Circuit Court of Appeals for the Seventh Circuit upheld a ruling in favor of Quincy finding an online seller of Prevagen liable for selling Prevagen products in damaged condition and products the seller knew or should have known to have been stolen, ordering the seller to pay $480,968.13 in damages. On August 24, 2023, the Florida Attorney General charged two members of a criminal ring with stealing $10,000 worth of Prevagen and other items. On May 21, 2024, a multistate theft ring leader was sentenced to federal prison for directing a crime ring that stole an estimated $9 million worth of merchandise, including Prevagen, Abreva, Zantac, and other products, over three years.
