= Martin Chalfie =

American scientist

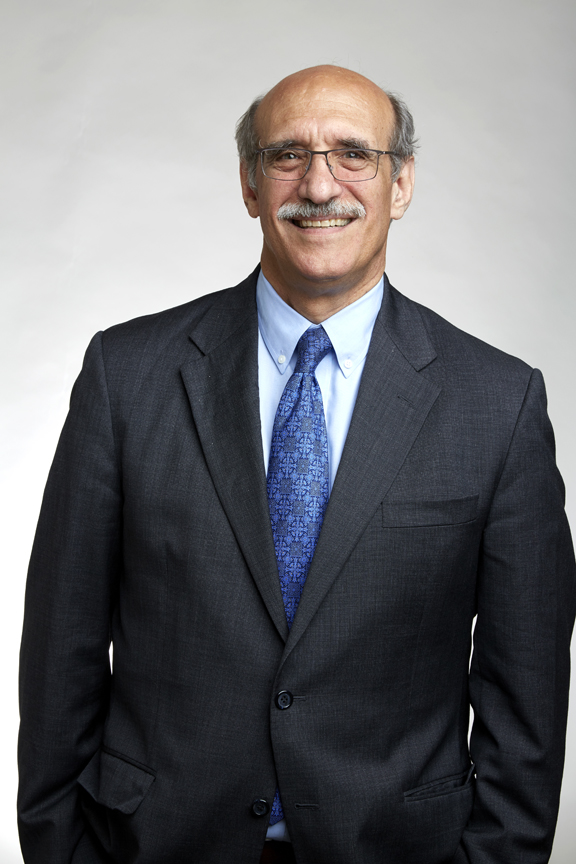
- Chalfie in 2018
- Born: Martin Lee Chalfie; January 15, 1947 (age 79); Chicago, Illinois, U.S.
- Education: Harvard University (BA, PhD)
- Known for: Green fluorescent protein
- Spouse: Tulle Hazelrigg
- Awards: E. B. Wilson Medal (2008); Nobel Prize in Chemistry (2008); Golden Goose Award (2012); Lomonosov Gold Medal (2018)
- Scientific career
- Fields: Neurobiology
- Institutions: Columbia University; Laboratory of Molecular Biology; University of Cambridge
- Thesis: Regulation of catecholamine biosynthesis and secretion in a rat pheochromocytoma (1977)
- Doctoral advisor: Robert L. Perlman
- Website: biology.columbia.edu/content/martin-chalfie

Martin Lee Chalfie (born January 15, 1947) is an American scientist. He is University Professor at Columbia University. He shared the 2008 Nobel Prize in Chemistry along with Osamu Shimomura and Roger Y. Tsien "for the discovery and development of the green fluorescent protein, GFP". He holds a PhD in neurobiology from Harvard University.

== Early life and education ==
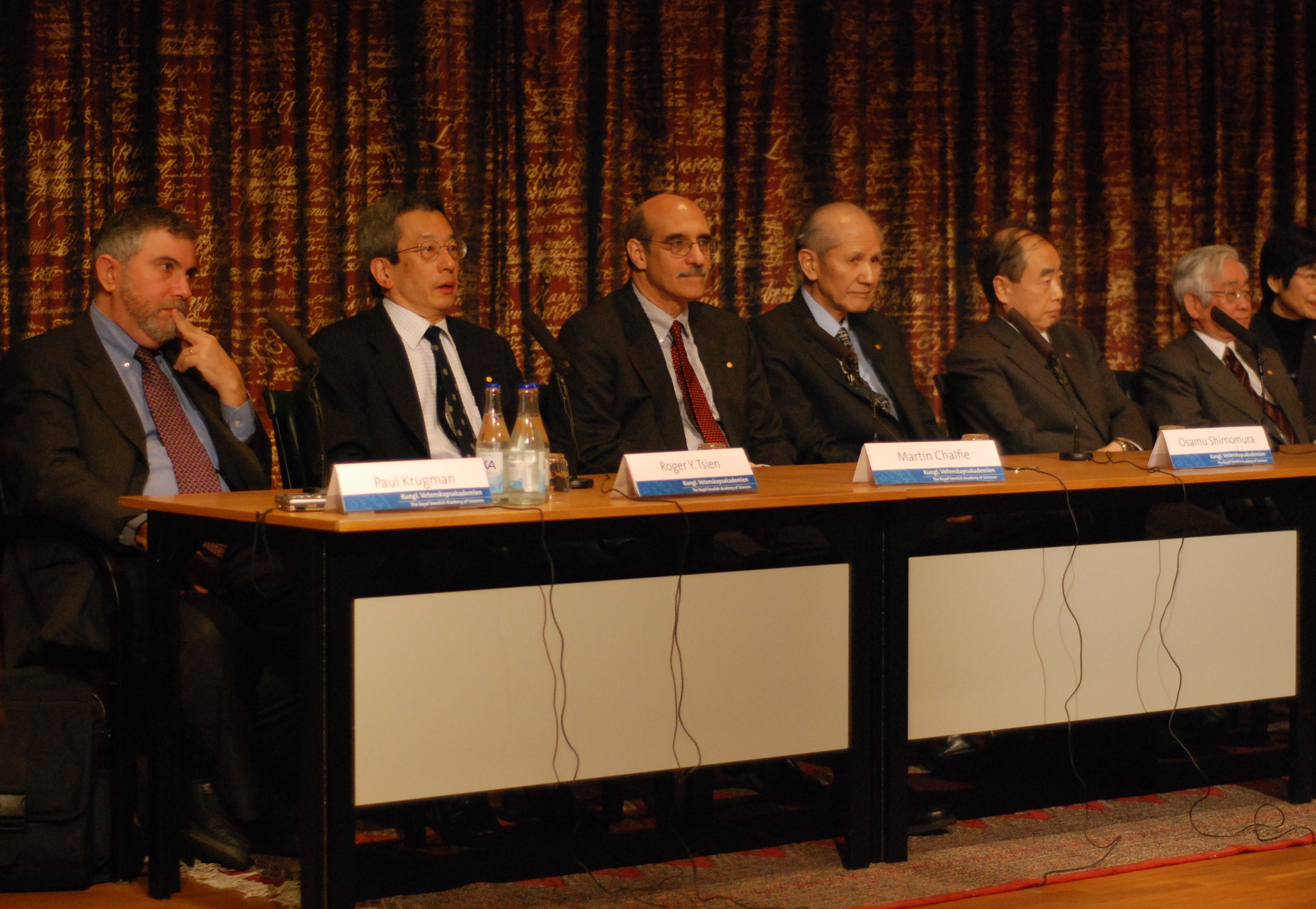
Paul Krugman, Roger Tsien, Martin Chalfie, Osamu Shimomura, Makoto Kobayashi and Toshihide Masukawa, Nobel Prize Laureates 2008, at a press conference at the Swedish Academy of Science in Stockholm.

Chalfie grew up in Chicago, Illinois, son of the guitarist Eli Chalfie (1910–1996) and owner of an apparel store Vivian Chalfie (née Friedlen, 1913–2005). His maternal grandfather, Meyer L. Friedlen, immigrated to Chicago from Moscow at an early age; his paternal grandparents, Benjamin and Esther Chalfie, came to Cincinnati from Brest-Litovsk and are Jewish.

He matriculated at Harvard University in 1965, intending to be a math major, but he switched to biochemistry because it combined his interests in chemistry, math, and biology. He spent the summer after his junior year working in the laboratory of Klaus Weber at Harvard, but "It was so disheartening to completely fail that I decided I shouldn't be in biology." As a result, in his senior year, he completed his major and took courses in law, theater, and Russian literature.

He also competed on the swim team at Harvard and was named captain in his senior year. At the time, swimming coach Bill Brooks said, "Marty will make an excellent captain because he has the admiration of the entire team." As captain, he won the Harold S. Ulen trophy, awarded "to a senior on the Harvard team who best demonstrates those qualities of leadership, sportsmanship, and team cooperation as exemplified by Harold S. Ulen." Following the announcement of Chalfie's Nobel award, his freshman-year roommate observed of Chalfie, "He would always identify himself as a swimmer."

After graduating in 1969, he worked at a variety of temporary jobs, such as selling dresses for his parents' dress manufacturing business in Chicago and teaching at Hamden Hall Country Day School in Hamden, Connecticut. In the summer of 1971, his research at the laboratory of Jose Zadunaisky at Yale University resulted in his first publication. With revived confidence, he returned to Harvard for graduate studies under Robert Perlman, and received his PhD in 1977.

== Career and research ==
Chalfie conducted his postdoctoral research at the Laboratory of Molecular Biology (LMB) with Sydney Brenner and John Sulston, and the three published a paper in 1985 on "The Neural Circuit for Touch Sensitivity in C. elegans". Chalfie then left the LMB in 1982 to join the faculty of Columbia University in the department of biological sciences and continued to study C. elegans touch mutants.

He married Tulle Hazelrigg. She later joined him on the faculty of Columbia University. She gave him permission to cite her unpublished research in his seminal Science paper "Green Fluorescent Protein as a Marker for Gene Expression" on condition that he made coffee, cooked, and emptied the garbage nightly for a month.

Chalfie and his wife had a daughter, Sarah, in July 1992.

Chalfie was elected to the National Academy of Sciences in 2004.

He slept through the phone call from the Nobel Prize Committee. When he woke up, he knew the prize would have been announced already, so he said "Okay, who's the schnook that got the Prize this time?" And so he opened up his laptop, got to the Nobel Prize site and found out that he was the schnook!

In 2015, Chalfie signed the Mainau Declaration 2015 on Climate Change on the final day of the 65th Lindau Nobel Laureate Meeting. The declaration was signed by a total of 76 Nobel Laureates and handed to then-President of the French Republic, François Hollande, as part of the successful COP21 climate summit in Paris.

Chalfie's lab uses the nematode ''C. elegans'' to investigate aspects of nerve cell development and function. The developmental, anatomical, genetic, and molecular information available for ''C. elegans'' makes it a well-studied model organism for these research areas.

He has published over 100 papers of which at least 25 have over 100 citations.

He traces his work on green fluorescent protein to a 1988 seminar from Paul Brehm about bioluminescent organisms, which led to some crucial experiments in 1992, detailed in his paper "Green fluorescent protein as a marker for gene expression", which is among the 20 most-cited papers in the field of Molecular Biology & Genetics. Chalfie won a Golden Goose Award for this work in 2012.

He received an honorary degree in physics from the University of Parma on July 4, 2023.

== Awards and honours ==
- 2003: Elected to the American Academy of Arts and Sciences
- 2004: Elected to the National Academy of Sciences
- 2006: Lewis S. Rosenstiel Award for Distinguished Work in Basic Medical Science, Brandeis University (shared with Roger Y. Tsien)
- 2007: Elected Fellow of the American Association for the Advancement of Science
- 2008: Nobel Prize in Chemistry (shared with Osamu Shimomura and Roger Y. Tsien) for the discovery and development of green fluorescent protein (GFP)
- 2008: E. B. Wilson Medal, American Society for Cell Biology (shared with Roger Y. Tsien)
- 2009: Elected to the Institute of Medicine
- 2012: Golden Goose Award
- 2023: Honorary degree in physics, University of Parma

== See also ==
- List of Jewish Nobel laureates
