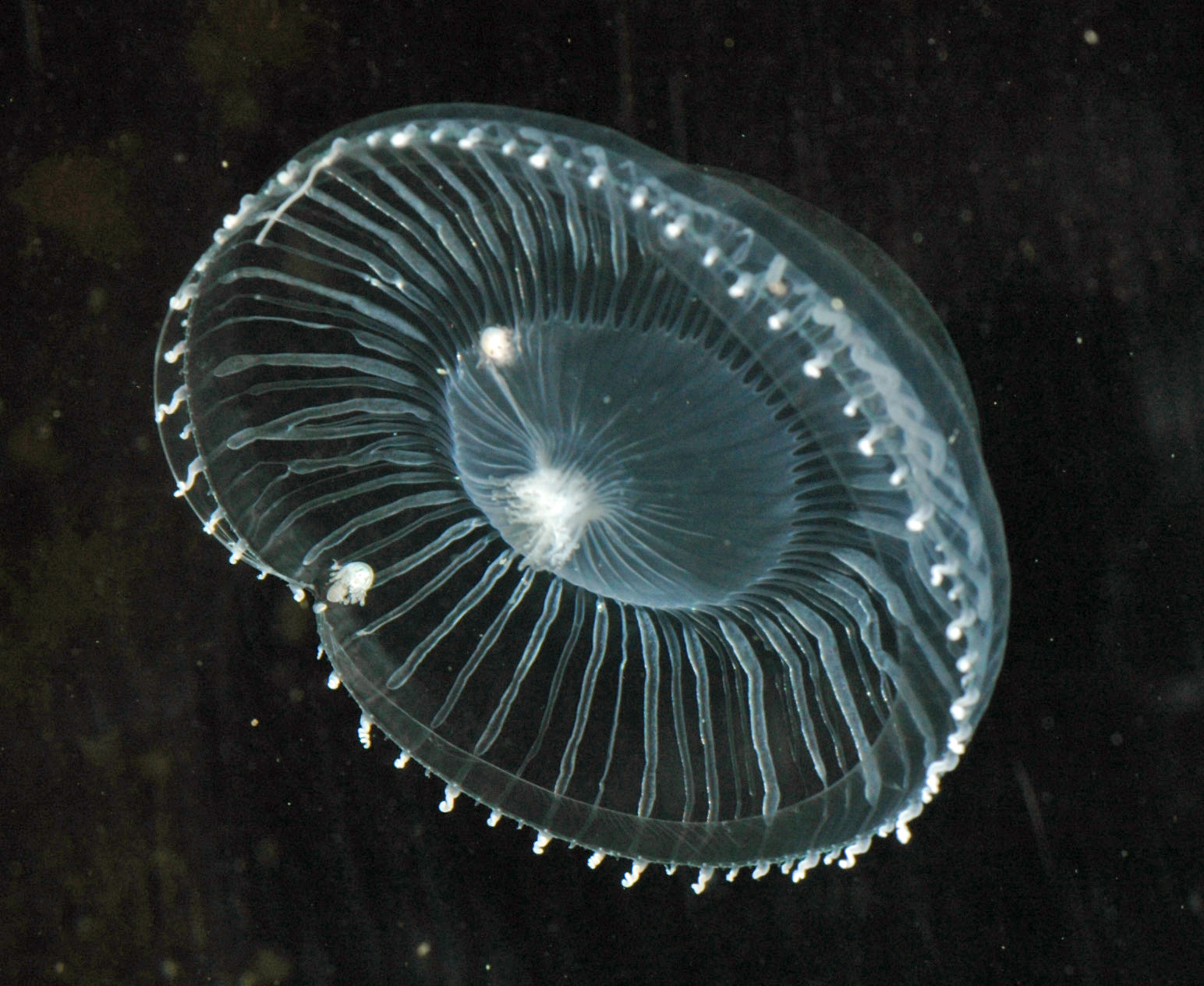
- Aequorea victoria (the "crystal jelly") with two amphipods

Scientific classification
- Kingdom: Animalia
- Phylum: Cnidaria
- Class: Hydrozoa
- Order: Leptothecata
- Family: Aequoreidae; Eschscholtz, 1829

Genera
- Aequorea; Aldersladia; Gangliostoma; Rhacostoma; Zygocanna

= Aequoreidae =

Family of hydrozoans

Aequoreidae is a family of hydrozoans, sometimes called the many-ribbed jellies or many-ribbed jellyfish. There are approximately 30 known species found in temperate and tropical marine coastal environments. Aequoreids include Aequorea victoria, the organism from which the green fluorescent protein gene was isolated.

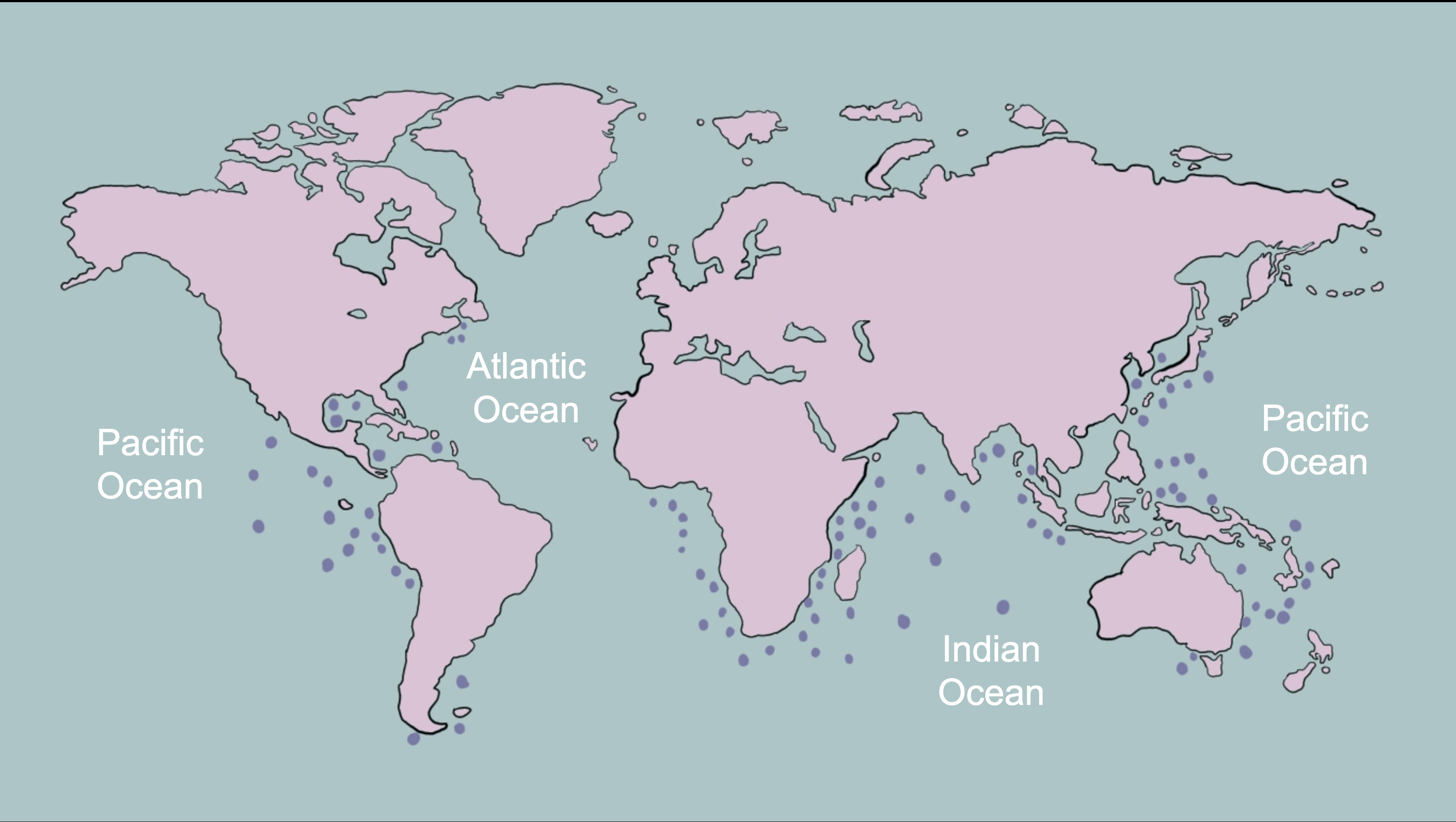
This map shows the distribution of the Aequoreidae family across the Pacific, Atlantic, and Indian ocean.

== Morphology ==
Polyps

Only the polyp stages of Aequorea species have been observed. The colonies are covered with chitinous periderm and can be either prostrate or erect with weak or sympodial branching. Young hydranths possess hydrothecae with a closing structure called operculum, which consists of several relatively long triangular folds that meet together in the centre when a disturbed polyp contracts. Because the operculum is quite fragile, hydrothecae of old polyps usually have only a small chitinous collar remaining. Comparatively large cylindrical gonothecae are attached to the colony with a thin peduncle. Commonly only one medusa develops in each gonotheca.

Medusae

Mature aequoreid medusae are diverse in shape, from lens-like to conical, and in size. The smallest, Aequerea parva is only 0.6 cm in diameter, while the largest, Rhacostoma atlanticum, can reach 40 cm in diameter. The medusae of most species are between 5 and 15 cm in diameter. They have larger stomachs called manubriums, lack a peduncle, and lack both lateral and marginal cirri. All genera have many radial canals with gonads on them. Some species, like Aequora pensilis can have more than 100 radial canals. Some differences between genera of Aequoreidae include the existence or absence of subumbrella papillae– Aequorea have them, while Rhacostoma lack them. Zygocanna only sometimes possess subumbrella papillae, they are more so characterized by branched (not simple) radial canals. Some members of Aequorea (like Aequorea victoria) are fluorescent – they have photogenic organs on the outer margins of their umbrellas on the sides of their tentacles that result in a green bioluminescent reaction.

== Distribution ==
The Aequoreidae Family is widely distributed across the globe, typically residing within the Atlantic, Pacific, and Indian Oceans. They are found to populate both tropical temperate waters, often at depths of 200 to, in some extreme cases, 1000 meters.

In habitats such as the North Sea, Aequorea populations heavily depend on the salinity of the waters they are in due to fluctuating hydrological processes influenced plankton variations.

Seasonality

Aequorea are present year-round, with a start in medusae population in early spring - comprising most of the medusa population in an area. The population peaks in the summer, then shrinks in the late autumn, its population reaching a minimum in March.

== Ecology ==
Feeding

Aequoreids, especially A. victoria, are known ovivores and predators of larval fish, copepods and other zooplankton, cnidarians, and ctenophores. They may have a preference for soft prey over crustacean-feeding counterparts. They prey on fish when they are young then compete with their older counterparts for zooplankton prey though observations on Aequorea's effect on zooplankton stocks may only be small.

Reproduction

Aequorea contain alternating asexual polyp and sexual medusa stages, with some species containing a benthic planula form.

Medusae engage in broadcast spawning, a form of external fertilization in the water column. 3-16% of Aequorea medusae's dry weight is released as eggs during spawning These eggs are then predated upon by other hydrozoan medusae such as Clytia gregaria.

Light may have a role as a trigger for sexual activity in Aequorea medusae as A. forskalea medusae release sperm when exposed to UV light and A. victoria in the Salish Sea are known to surface at dawn to spawn.

Half of all known Aequoreids have asexually reproducing hydroids. The increase in population due to these hydroids may have a role in large hydrozoan population increases: blooms.

Death and Parasites

The Aequoreid life cycle can end during the medusa stage from hyperiid amphipods parasitizing on their internal sacs: burrowing and eating through them. When this happens in the autumn, the medusa has difficulty regenerating its lost tissue. Species are differentially affected by this though, as A. forksalea medusae have low rates of hyperiid infestation. Flukes spend part of their life cycle within medusae as secondary hosts. The medusae are then eaten by a definitive host fish.

A. victoria is frequently harvested by humans for aequorin, making humans a major predator of theirs. Green Fluorescent Protein (GFP) has also been used in place of aequorin, decreasing its demand. Aequorea species are also bycatch in jellyfish fisheries in Vietnam.

Climate Change

Aequoreids are affected by climate change through the processes of eutrophication and ocean acidification, which both reduce competition in their habitats.

Eutrophication is driven by changing water composition from modified currents and pollution. Blooms and the conditions therein: low oxygen, low visibility, high prey items favor jellies over fish, whose populations aren’t limited by prey population density.

Ocean acidification is driven by increasing atmospheric CO_{2} concentrations. Aequoreidae are more tolerant of lower pH compared to fish.

== Genera ==
Aequoreidae includes the following genera:

- Aequorea Péron et Lesueur, 1810 – ca. 20 valid species
- Aldersladia Gershwin, 2006 – 1 valid species

Genus Aldersladia contains only Aldersladia magnificus, found in Australia - common in Darwin Harbour. It is characterized by having one or a few obvious solid papillae under its radial canals, which are found under its umbrella. It is correlated with female hyperiid amphipod parasites of species Lestrigonus bengalensis on its umbrella. It used to be misidentified as Aequorea pensilis, as its papillae under its umbrella were previously ignored.

- Gangliostoma Xu, 1983 – 2 valid species

The Gangliostoma genera contains two species: Gangliostoma dayaensis and the recently discovered Gangliostoma guangdongensis. G. guangdongensis contains a marginal more radial canals and tentacles—between 38 to 56 and 90 to 108 respectively—than G. dayaensis, which contains only around 33 radial canals and 13 tentacles. G. dayaensis, while containing shorter oral lips contains a distinct excretory papillae with 3 rudimentary bulbs and 4 statocysts, contrasting with G. guangdongensis complete lack of rudimentary bulbs and excretory papillae and singular statocyst.

- Rhacostoma L. Agassiz, 1850 – 1 valid species

Rhacostoma have papillae underneath their subumbrella, and have a single species in their genera; Rhacostoma atlanticum which is the largest species from the Aequoreidae family, ranging from 300 mm to 400 mm wide. Their stomachs are around one third to a half the size of their body width.

- Zygocanna Haeckel, 1879 – 5 valid species

== See also ==
- Aequorea tenuis
- Aequorea victoria
