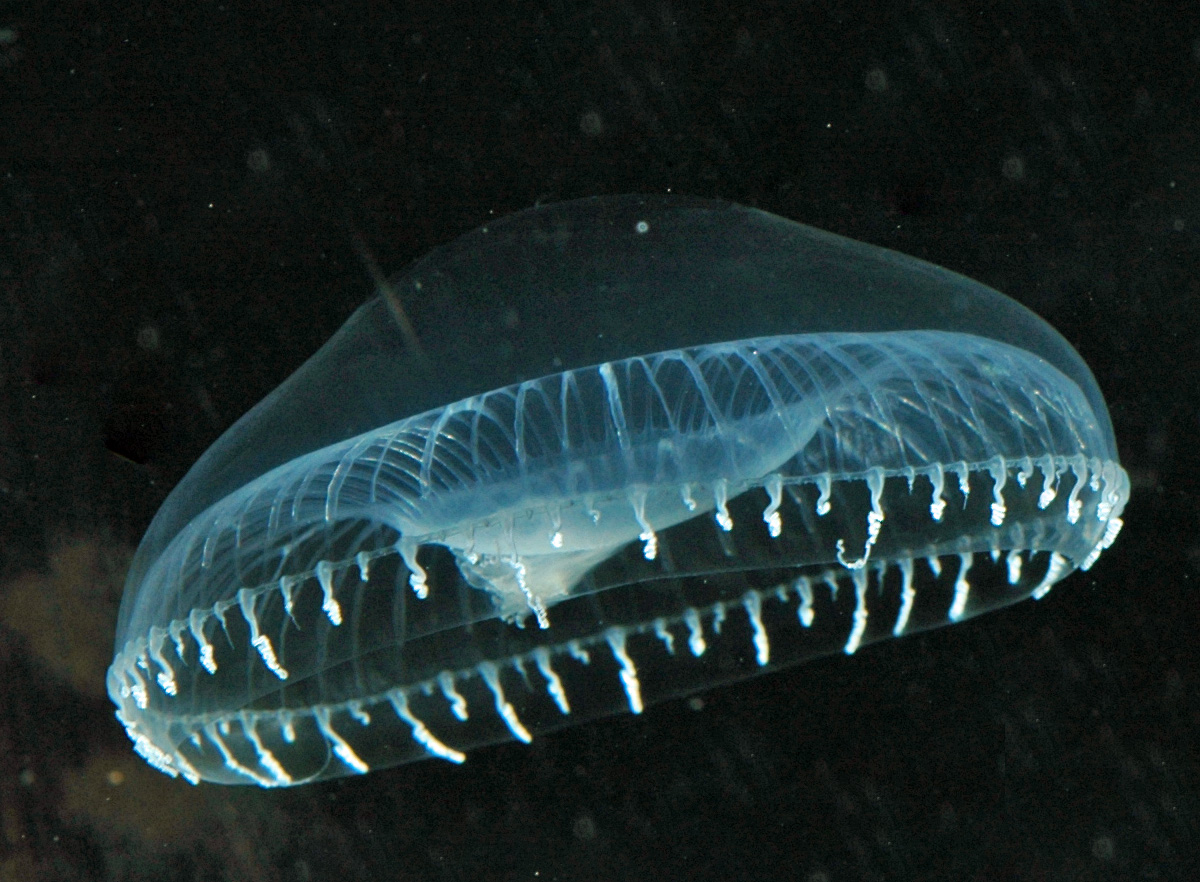

Scientific classification
- Kingdom: Animalia
- Phylum: Cnidaria
- Class: Hydrozoa
- Order: Leptothecata
- Family: Aequoreidae
- Genus: Aequorea
- Species: A. victoria

Binomial name
- Aequorea victoria (Murbach and Shearer, 1902)

Synonyms
- Mesonema victoria Murbach & Shearer, 1902; Campanulina membranosa Strong, 1925

= Aequorea victoria =

Species of hydrozoan

Aequorea victoria, also sometimes called the crystal jelly, is a bioluminescent hydrozoan jellyfish, or hydromedusa, that is found off the west coast of North America.

The species is best known as the source of aequorin (a photoprotein), and green fluorescent protein (GFP); two proteins involved in bioluminescence. Their discoverers, Osamu Shimomura and colleagues, won the 2008 Nobel Prize in Chemistry for their work on GFP.

== Description ==
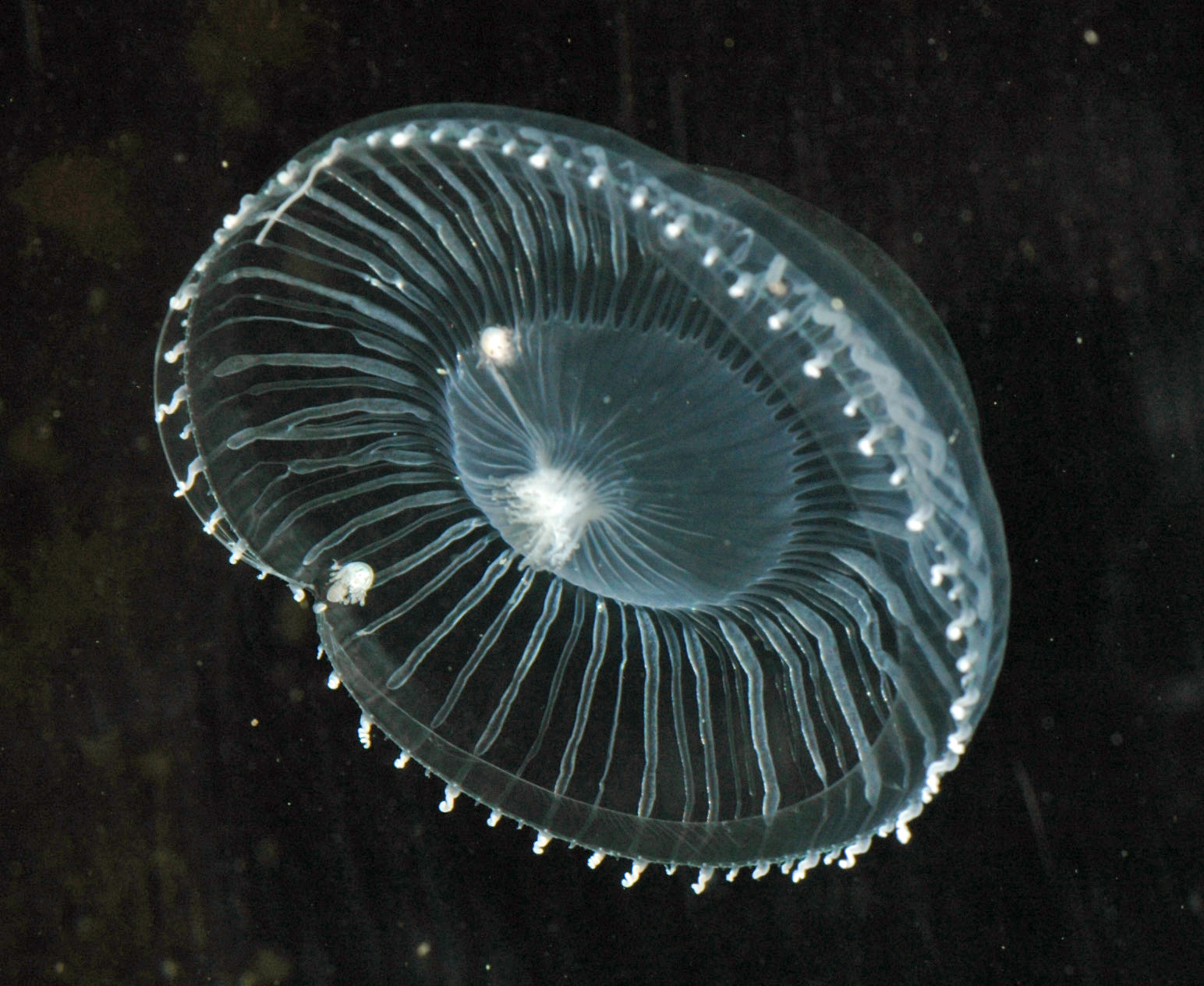
Ventral view with hyperiid amphipod

Almost entirely transparent and colorless, and sometimes difficult to resolve, Aequorea victoria possess a highly contractile mouth and manubrium at the center of up to 100 radial canals that extend to the bell margin. The bell margin is surrounded by uneven tentacles, up to 150 of them in fully-grown specimens. The tentacles possess nematocysts that aid in prey capture, although they have no effect on humans. Specimens larger than 3 cm usually possess gonads for sexual reproduction, which run most of the length of the radial canals and are visible in the photos in this article as whitish thickenings along the radial canals. The bell margin is ringed with the muscular velum, which is typical of hydromedusae, and aids in locomotion through muscular contraction of the bell. Larger specimens are frequently found with symbiotic hyperiid amphipods attached to the subumbrella, or even occasionally living inside the gut or radial canals.

== Distribution ==
Aequorea victoria are found along the North American west coast of the Pacific Ocean from the Bering Sea to southern California. The medusa part of the life cycle is a pelagic organism, which is budded off a bottom-living polyp in late spring. The medusae can be found floating and swimming both nearshore and offshore in the eastern Pacific Ocean; this species is particularly common in Puget Sound.

== Identification ==
Aequorea species can be fairly difficult to tell apart, as the morphological features on which identifications are made are mostly the numbers of tentacles, numbers of radial canals, numbers of marginal statocysts, and size. These features are fairly plastic, and the numbers of tentacles and radial canals increase in all species of Aequorea with size. One other species is occasionally found in the same geographical range as Aequorea victoria; this other form has been called Aequorea coerulescens. While A. coerulescens is apparently generally found offshore in the eastern Pacific Ocean, rare specimens have been collected in central California and in Friday Harbor, North Puget Sound. While morphologically similar to Aequorea victoria, the Aequorea coerulescens form is larger (roughly the size of a dinner plate) with many more radial canals. Animals of sizes intermediate between these two forms are also rather intermediate in appearance, making morphological identifications difficult.

This species is thought to be synonymous with Aequorea aequorea of Osamu Shimomura, the discoverer of green fluorescent protein (GFP). Shimomura together with Martin Chalfie and Roger Y. Tsien were awarded the 2008 Nobel Prize in Chemistry for the discovery and development of this protein as an important biological research tool. Originally the A. victoria name was used to designate the variant found in the Pacific, and the A. aequorea designation was used for specimens found in the Atlantic and Mediterranean. The species name used in GFP purification was later disputed by M.N. Arai and A. Brinckmann-Voss (1980), who decided to separate them on the basis of 40 specimens collected from around Vancouver Island. Shimomura notes that this species in general shows great variation: from 1961 to 1988 he collected around 1 million individuals in the waters surrounding the Friday Harbor Laboratories of University of Washington, and in many cases there were pronounced variations in the form of the jellyfish.

== Life history ==
Aequorea victoria have a dimorphic life history, alternating between asexual benthic polyps and sexual planktonic medusae in a seasonal pattern. Aequorea victoria juvenile medusae are asexually budded off hydroid colonies in late spring; these free-living hydromedusae will spend all of their lives in the plankton. The medusa spends its first stage of life growing quickly, and after reaching approximately 3 cm will begin producing gametes for reproduction. Each medusa is either a male or a female. The eggs and spermatozoa mature daily in the medusa gonads, given enough food, and are free-spawned into the water column in response to a daily light cue, where they are fertilized and eventually settle out to form a new hydroid colony. The hydroids live on hard or rocky substrates on the bottom, where they asexually bud new tiny jellyfish each springtime in response to some (still unknown) environmental cue(s). The medusa form generally lives approximately 6 months, roughly from late spring into the autumn.

== Natural history ==
Aequorea victoria typically feed on soft-bodied organisms, but the diet may also include some crustacean zooplankton such as copepods, crab zoëals, barnacle nauplii and other larval planktonic organisms. Gelatinous organisms consumed include ctenophores, appendicularians and other hydromedusae, including rarely other Aequorea victoria if conditions are appropriate. Aequorea victoria is an intraguild predator, it preys upon other gelatinous zooplankton which compete for the same prey, this plays a significant role in the population dynamics of planktonic food webs (Purcell, 1991). Prey is ensnared in long tentacles containing nematocysts, and ingested with a highly contractile mouth that can expand to consume organisms half the medusae's size. Due to their voracious nature, Aequorea victoria density can be inversely correlated to zooplankton density, indicating a competitive presence in shared environments.

The swimming velocity of Aequorea victoria does not increase as their body size increases which deems them as inefficient swimmers. Therefore, they require direct contact with their prey in order to feed which is effectively done through energetic propulsion in which pressure allows them to passively move in their environment.

== Predators ==
Aequorea medusae are eaten by the voracious scyphozoan Cyanea capillata, commonly called the lion's mane jelly, as well as ctenophores, siphonophorae and other hydromedusae, including documented cases of cannibalism. Many larger specimens are found with the parasitic hyperiid amphipod Hyperia medusarum attached to the either the subumbrella or exumbrella; these amphipods may burrow into the jelly, but such activities are not lethal to the jellyfish.

== Luminescence ==
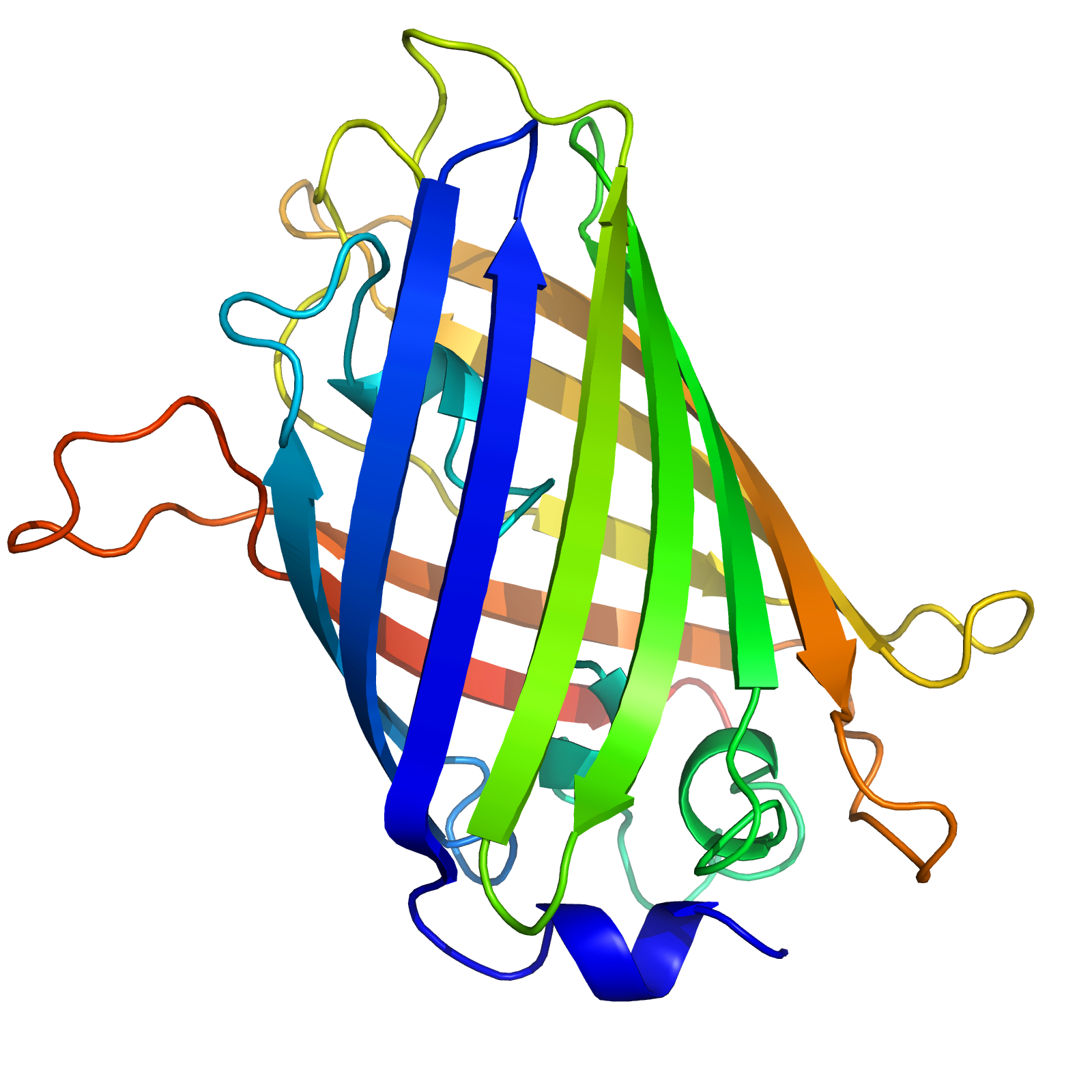
Green fluorescent protein ribbon diagram

This jellyfish is capable of producing flashes of blue light by a quick release of calcium (Ca^{2+}), which interacts with the photoprotein aequorin. The blue light produced is in turn transduced to green by the now famous green fluorescent protein (GFP). This transduction of energy is called Förster resonance energy transfer (FRET). Both aequorin and GFP are important fluorescent markers frequently employed in biochemical research.

In 1961, Shimomura and Johnson isolated the protein aequorin, and its small molecule cofactor, coelenterazine, from large numbers of Aequorea jellyfish at Friday Harbor Laboratories. They discovered, after initially finding bright luminescence on adding seawater to a purified sample, that calcium ions (Ca^{2+}) were required to trigger bioluminescence. This research also marked the beginning of research into green fluorescent protein which was summarized by Shimomura. In 1967, Ridgeway and Ashley microinjected aequorin into single muscle fibers of barnacles, and observed transient calcium ion-dependent signals during muscle contraction.

For his research into GFP, Osamu Shimomura was awarded the 2008 Nobel Prize for chemistry, together with Martin Chalfie and Roger Tsien.

This discovery led to great advancements in the field of medicine because it allows for further understanding in treatments and medical diagnoses through research in cells and bacteria.
