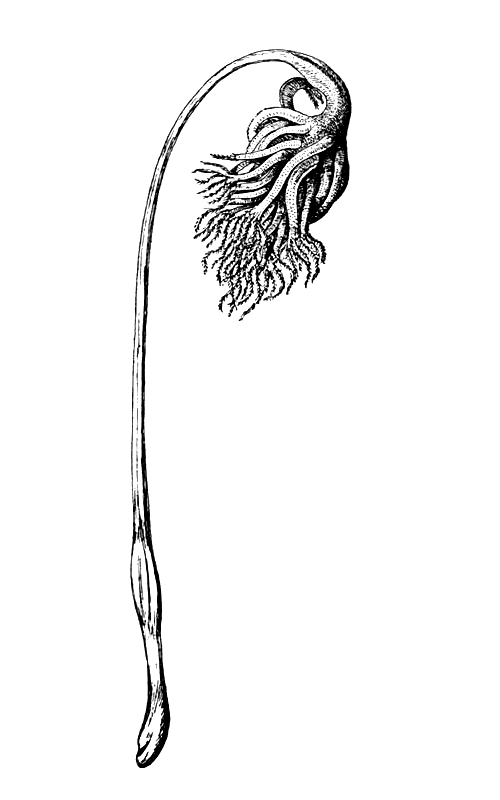
- Umbellula encrinus
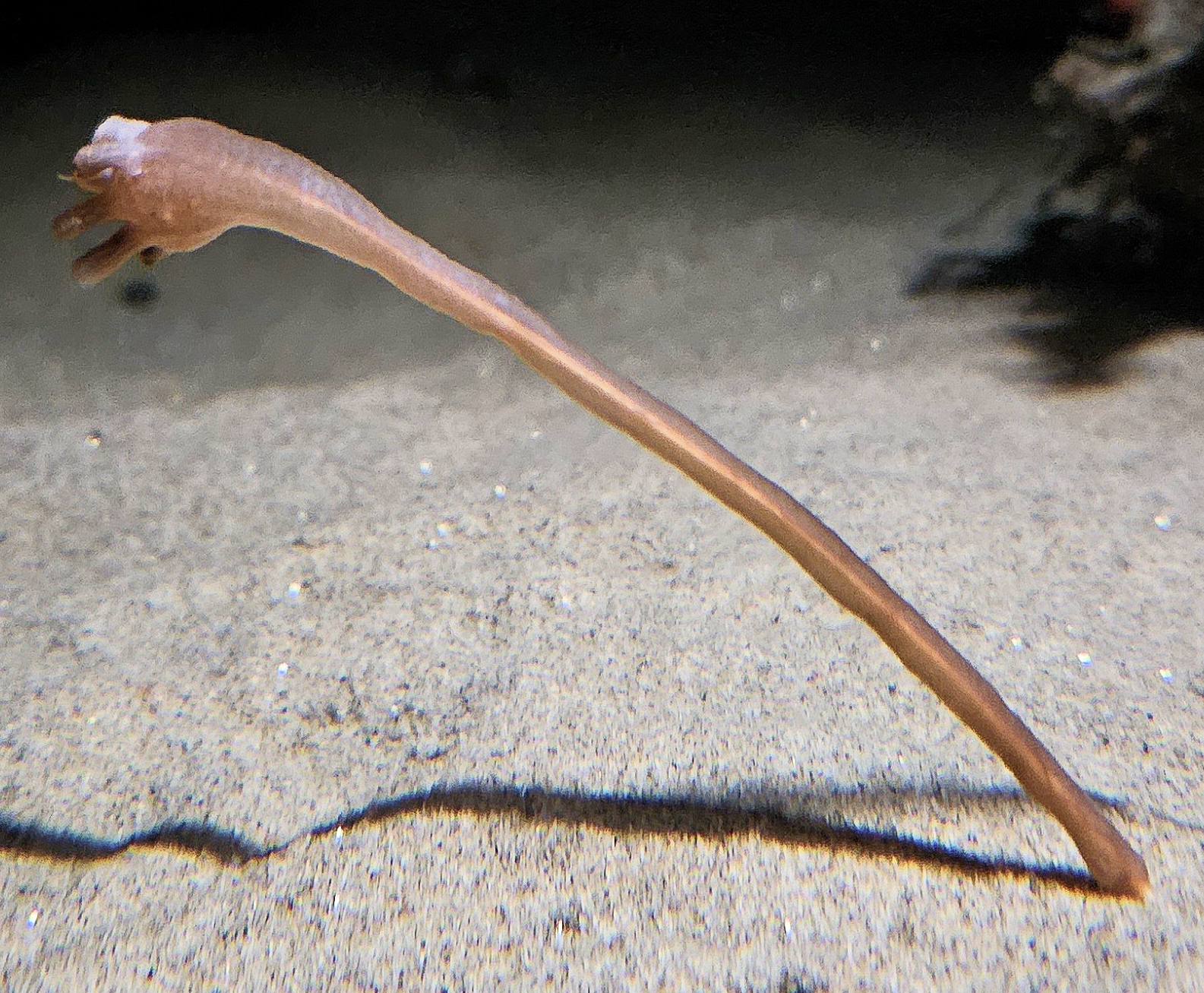

Scientific classification
- Kingdom: Animalia
- Phylum: Cnidaria
- Subphylum: Anthozoa
- Class: Octocorallia
- Order: Scleralcyonacea
- Family: Umbellulidae
- Genus: Umbellula; Cuvier, [1797]

Type species
- Umbellula encrinus (Linnaeus, 1758)

Species
- See text

Synonyms
- List: Crinillum Harting, Miguel & Hoeven, 1861; Ombellula Gray, 1870; Ombellulaires Cuvier, 1817; Ombellularia Lamarck, 1836; Umbellaria Schweigger, 1820; Umbellularia Lamarck, 1801

= Umbellula =

Genus of corals

Umbellula is a genus of deep-sea cnidarians in the monotypic family Umbellulidae. Sea pens of this genus are known to be bioluminescent and hermaphroditic.

== Description ==
Species of Umbellula form colonial structures, which is common amongst pennatulacean octocorals (sea pens). Around the primary polyp distal region, secondary polyps form which are either larger autozooids (feeding polyps) or smaller siphonozooids (water circulation polyps). The morphological adaptations of Umbellula species reflect adaptations to unique deep-sea environments, including differences in polyp arrangement and sclerite presence or absence. Species such as Umbellula encrinus having a typical cluster of autozooids, while Umbellula pomona only possessing a terminal cluster of three autozooids. Umbellula autozooids are found clustered at the very end of their stalk, unlike most other sea pens in which autozooids are spread along the rachis.

Most species of Umbellula have a strong, muscular peduncle which is used to anchor them in soft sediment, allowing them to inhabit areas of uniform benthic environments such as abyssal plains.

== Bioluminescence ==
Similarly to many deep-sea animals, some species of Umbellula can shift the color of their bioluminescence from blue to green using fluorescent proteins. More specifically, a 2018 study of Umbellula magniflora found that it's bioluminescence system uses the luciferin coelenterazine, similar to other cnidarians. The study also reported that luminous components from Umbellula can cross-react with individuals of the soft coral Renilla reniformis to generate light. This suggests functional similarities between the bioluminescence systems of these evolutionarily divergent species.

== Reproduction ==
The reproductive biology of sea pens in general remains poorly studied. Unlike in other sea pens in which oocytes develop in the autozooid column, Umbellula oocytes develop at the base of the polyps and in the cluster tissue. It appears that the potential fecundity of Umbellula species is high, with individuals containing up to 2,000 large ooyctes. This is thought to be advantageous to overcome long inter-colony distances seen in Umbellula species. It was previously believed that Umbellula exhibited gonochorism until a 2025 study confirmed the presence of hermaphroditism in five out of six Umbellula species. This study examined 16 specimens across six distinct species of the genus Umbellula, and found gametogenic tissue in all specimens studied. Two of the six species were shown to be trioecious, another first for Umbellula species

== Distribution ==
While there is a lack of conclusive study for Umbellula's distribution patterns, they can be found ranging from bathyal to abyssal depths, primarily in the Arctic Ocean, and also the northeast and southern Atlantic Ocean.

Umbellula are known to be one of the only genus of sea pen found at depths of 4000m or greater.

== Taxonomy ==
Despite the unique morphology of this sea pen genus, species identification is made difficult due to limited access to these organisms, and a traditional reliance on a small number of morphological characteristics, which has resulted in limited knowledge of intraspecific variation.

The following species are considered valid by the World Register of Marine Species:

- Umbellula ambigua Marion, 1906
- Umbellula antarctica Kükenthal, 1902
- Umbellula carpenteri Kölliker, 1880
- Umbellula dura Thomson & Henderson, 1906
- Umbellula durissima Kölliker, 1880
- Umbellula encrinus (Linnaeus, 1758)
- Umbellula guentheri Kölliker, 1880
- Umbellula hemigymna Pasternak, 1975
- Umbellula huxleyi Kölliker, 1880
- Umbellula koellikeri Kükenthal, 1902
- Umbellula koellikeri Thomson & Henderson, 1906 (unreplaced junior homonym of Umbellula koellikeri Kükenthal, 1902)
- Umbellula leptocaulis Kölliker, 1880
- Umbellula lindahli Kölliker, 1875
- Umbellula magniflora Kölliker, 1880
- Umbellula pellucida Kükenthal, 1902
- Umbellula pomona Risaro, Williams & Lauretta, 2020
- Umbellula purpurea Thomson & Henderson, 1906
- Umbellula radiata Thomson & Henderson, 1906
- Umbellula rigida Kükenthal, 1902
- Umbellula rosea Thomson & Henderson, 1906
- Umbellula spicata Kükenthal, 1902
- Umbellula thomsoni (Kölliker, 1874)
- Umbellula valdiviae Kükenthal, 1902
- Umbellula weberi Hickson, 1916

The following species are of uncertain validity, and many are nomen dubium:

- Umbellula aciculifera J.S. Thomson, 1915
- Umbellula crassiflora Roule, 1905
- Umbellula elongata Thomson & Henderson, 1906
- Umbellula geniculata Studer, 1894
- Umbellula gilberti Nutting, 1908
- Umbellula grandiflora Kölliker
- Umbellula hendersoni Balss, 1906
- Umbellula indica Thomson & Henderson, 1906
- Umbellula intermedia Thomson & Henderson, 1906
- Umbellula jordani Nutting, 1908
- Umbellula loma Nutting, 1909
- Umbellula simplex Kölliker, 1880

Only an estimated ten of the forty-three described Umbellula species are considered valid members of the genus.

Species of Umbellula were traditionally classified as a single group based on their morphology, but a 2013 molecular analysis that used the mitochondrial genes mtMutS and ND2 has revealed that the genus Umbellula is polyphyletic, and the species currently in the genus did not form a single clade (natural group). These two distinct evolutionary lineages managed to have evolved similar appearances through evolutionary convergence.

Genetic research revealed two primary clades within the genus. Umbellula clade I contains species that typically lack the combination of a round internal axis and the presence of sclerites. The types of species in this clade include Umbellula encrinus, U. thomsoni, U. carpenteri, and U. huxleyi amongst other species.

Umbellula Clade II is a lineage that is characterized by having both a round axis and conspicuous sclerites. This clade includes U. monocephalus and the recently discovered U. pomona.

The following cladogram is based on that 2013 study:

- Ctenocella barbadensis
- Verrucella
- - - - - - - Umbellula thomsoni
            - - - Umbellula carpenteri
                - Umbellula huxleyi
              - - Umbellula magniflora
                - - Umbellula encrinus (Type)
                  - Umbellula sp.1
          - Sclerobelemnon theseus
          - - Pteroeides
            - Virgularia mirabilis
        - - - - Pennatula spp.
              - Renilla muelleri
            - - Pennatula
              - Distichoptilum gracile
          - Protoptilum
      - - - Kophobelemnon spp.
          - Funiculina armata
        - Gyrophyllum
    - - - Umbellula sp.2
        - Umbellula monocephalus
      - - Scleroptilum grandiflorum
        - Halipteris finmarchica
  - Anthoptilum

Umbellula monocephalus is now placed in Solumbellula.
