= Bioluminescence tomography =

Non-invasive optical imaging technique

Bioluminescence tomography (BLT) is a non-invasive optical imaging technique used to reconstruct the three-dimensional distribution of bioluminescent sources from emitted light signals. It is primarily used in preclinical research to study molecular and cellular processes in living organisms. BLT emerged from bioluminescence imaging as a tomographic approach for estimating three-dimensional source distributions.

== Background ==
Bioluminescence, the emission of light by living organisms, has been documented since antiquity. Aristotle and Pliny the Elder described luminous organisms including fireflies, glow-worms, jellyfish, and mollusks. In laboratory research, bioluminescent reporter systems have made it possible to follow biological processes in living animals using emitted light. Conventional bioluminescence imaging records two-dimensional optical signals at the surface, which limits its ability to localize deeper sources. This limitation contributed to the development of bioluminescence tomography as a three-dimensional reconstruction method for improved source localization. Early BLT research addressed the mathematical and computational basis for estimating internal source distributions from surface measurements. Early work by Ge Wang and colleagues at the University of Iowa was also associated with patented systems and methods for multi-spectral bioluminescence imaging.

== Principles ==
BLT uses light emitted by bioluminescent markers within a living subject. These markers may be genetically encoded or introduced chemically into specific tissues or cells. Following reaction with a substrate, the markers emit light, which is detected using imaging systems such as CCD cameras.

The reconstruction process generally involves surface signal acquisition, light propagation modeling, and computational image reconstruction. Signal collection may be performed by acquiring multiple two-dimensional images from different angles around the subject. Light propagation modeling describes the scattering and absorption of light as it travels through biological tissue, based on mathematical representations of optical transport.

Because light propagation in tissue is highly scattering and attenuating, BLT reconstruction is an ill-posed inverse problem that usually requires regularization and anatomical or optical priors. Reconstruction algorithms then estimate the three-dimensional location and intensity of internal bioluminescent sources from the surface measurements.

== Applications ==
BLT is used in preclinical biomedical research. In cancer research, it has been used to monitor tumor growth and metastasis in animal models, including breast tumor models. Model-based BLT has also been used to estimate the three-dimensional location and strength of luciferase-expressing sources in vivo. In preclinical radiotherapy research, BLT has been used to guide small-animal radiation delivery and to assess radiation-induced tumor response.
