= Bioluminescence imaging =

Imaging of engineered E. coli Nissle 1917 in the mouse gut

Bioluminescence imaging (BLI) is a technology developed over the past decades (1990's and onward). that allows for the noninvasive study of ongoing biological processes Recently, bioluminescence tomography (BLT) has become possible and several systems have become commercially available. In 2011, PerkinElmer acquired one of the most popular lines of optical imaging systems with bioluminescence from Caliper Life Sciences.

== Background ==
Bioluminescence is the process of light emission in living organisms. Bioluminescence imaging utilizes native light emission from one of several organisms which bioluminesce, also known as luciferase enzymes. The three main sources are the North American firefly, the sea pansy (and related marine organisms), and bacteria like Photorhabdus luminescens and Vibrio fischeri. The DNA encoding the luminescent protein is incorporated into the laboratory animal either via a viral vector or by creating a transgenic animal. Rodent models of cancer spread can be studied through bioluminescence imaging, e.g. for mouse models of breast cancer metastasis.

Systems derived from the three groups above differ in key ways:

- Firefly luciferase requires D-luciferin to be injected into the subject prior to imaging. The peak emission wavelength is about 560 nm. Due to the attenuation of blue-green light in tissues, the red-shift (compared to the other systems) of this emission makes detection of firefly luciferase much more sensitive in vivo.
- Renilla luciferase (from the Sea pansy) requires its substrate, coelenterazine, to be injected as well. As opposed to luciferin, coelenterazine has a lower bioavailability (likely due to MDR1 transporting it out of mammalian cells). Additionally, the peak emission wavelength is about 480 nm.
- Bacterial luciferase has an advantage in that the lux operon used to express it also encodes the enzymes required for substrate biosynthesis. Although originally believed to be functional only in prokaryotic organisms, where it is widely used for developing bioluminescent pathogens, it has been genetically engineered to work in mammalian expression systems as well. This luciferase reaction has a peak wavelength of about 490 nm.

While the total amount of light emitted from bioluminescence is typically small and not detected by the human eye, an ultra-sensitive CCD camera can image bioluminescence from an external vantage point.

== Applications ==
Common applications of BLI include in vivo studies of infection (with bioluminescent pathogens), cancer progression (using a bioluminescent cancer cell line), and reconstitution kinetics (using bioluminescent stem cells).

Researchers at UT Southwestern Medical Center have shown that bioluminescence imaging can be used to determine the effectiveness of cancer drugs that choke off a tumor's blood supply. The technique requires luciferin to be added to the bloodstream, which carries it to cells throughout the body. When luciferin reaches cells that have been altered to carry the firefly gene, those cells emit light.

The BLT inverse problem of 3D reconstruction of the distribution of bioluminescent molecules from data measured on the animal surface is inherently ill-posed. The first small animal study using BLT was conducted by researchers at the University of Southern California, Los Angeles, USA in 2005. Following this development, many research groups in USA and China have built systems that enable BLT.

Mustard plants have had the gene that makes fireflies' tails glow added to them so that the plants glow when touched. The effect lasts for an hour, but an utra-sensitive camera is needed to see the glow.

== Autoluminograph ==
An autoluminograph is a photograph produced by placing a light emitting object directly on a piece of film. A famous example is an autoluminograph published in Science magazine in 1986 of a glowing transgenic tobacco plant bearing the luciferase gene of fireflies placed on Kodak Ektachrome 200 film.

== Induced metabolic bioluminescence imaging ==
Induced metabolic bioluminescence imaging (imBI) is used to obtain a metabolic snapshot of biological tissues. Metabolites that may be quantified through imBI include glucose, lactate, pyruvate, ATP, glucose-6-phosphate, or D2-hydroxygluturate. imBI can be used to determine the lactate concentration of tumors or to measure the metabolism of the brain.
