= Renilla koellikeri =

Scientific classification
- Kingdom: Animalia
- Phylum: Cnidaria
- Subphylum: Anthozoa
- Class: Octocorallia
- Order: Scleralcyonacea
- Family: Renillidae
- Genus: Renilla
- Species: R. koellikeri

Binomial name
- Renilla koellikeri (Pfeffer, 1886)

Species of Renilla

Renilla koellikeri (also spelled R. kollikeri or R. köllikeri) is a species of sea pen that has been reported from the southern coast of California, including Santa Barbara, California.
