= Howard Harold Seliger =

American bioluminescence scientist

Howard Harold Seliger (4 December 1924, New York City – 20 December 2012) was a physicist, biochemist, and biology professor, known for his research on bioluminescence.

== Biography ==
Seliger graduated from Townsend Harris High School in 1939 and from the City College of New York in 1943). After serving in the U.S. Air Force from 1943 to 1946, he studied physics at Purdue University and graduated there with M.S. in 1948. From 1948 to 1958 he was a senior physicist in the Radioactivity Division of the National Bureau of Standards (NBS) and was enrolled part-time at the University of Maryland. He graduated there with Ph.D. in 1954. At the NBS he developed a highly sensitive method of measurement of photons produced by radioactive emissions. He was elected a Fellow of the American Physical Society in 1958. With the aid of a recommendation by W. F. Libby, Seliger became a Guggenheim Fellow for the academic year 1958–1959, which he spent in the biology department of Johns Hopkins University. There he worked with William D. McElroy, who had recently isolated the enzyme luciferase. Seliger used his measurement techniques for photon scintillation to make the first measurement of the quantum yield of the firefly light reaction. This was the beginning of his outstanding achievements in the study of bioluminescence in fireflies, bacteria, phytoplankton, fish, and ctenophores.

Seliger, as part of a team of Johns Hopkins scientists, studied more than 100 different species of fireflies in Maryland and on the island of Jamaica. He built an instrument, called by him a "firefly gun," which his team used in making the first measurements of the specific flash patterns of various firefly species in their natural habitat. Their research "showed that the species-specific colors of the bioluminescence of fireflies represented natural selection for the optimization of the ratio of light signals to interfering ambient light intensities (noise) at the times of their emergence."

In the work for which he is perhaps best known, Seliger's firefly research helped other scientists harness bioluminescent molecules to identify key sections of DNA for genetic studies. And he used such fluorescent molecules to probe carcinogenic compounds in cigarette smoke. He also was able to see which potentially carcinogenic compounds became most dangerous by measuring the low-intensity light produced as the compounds react with enzymes inside cells.

Seliger was the president of the American Society for Photobiology in 1980–1981. Until he was 75 years old, he taught and did research at Johns Hopkins University. He was elected a Fellow of the American Association for the Advancement of Science in 1997.

He was married for 69 years to the former Beatrice Semel (born in 1926). Upon his death at the age of 88, he was survived by his widow, two daughters, two grandsons, and a great-grandson.

== Selected publications ==
=== Articles ===
- Seliger, H.H. (1956). "The applications of standards of radioactivity". The International Journal of Applied Radiation and Isotopes. 1 (3): 215–232. doi:10.1016/0020-708X(56)90009-6. PMID 13376138.
- Seliger, H.H.; McElroy, W.D. (1960). "Spectral emission and quantum yield of firefly bioluminescence". Archives of Biochemistry and Biophysics. 88: 136–141. doi:10.1016/0003-9861(60)90208-3. PMID 14444706.
- Seliger, H. H.; McElroy, W. D. (1964). "The Colors of Firefly Bioluminescence: Enzyme Configuration and Species Specificity". Proceedings of the National Academy of Sciences of the United States of America. 52 (1): 75–81. Bibcode:1964PNAS...52...75S. doi:10.1073/pnas.52.1.75. PMC 300576. PMID 16591195.
- McElroy, W. D.; Seliger, H. H.; White, E. H. (1969). "Mechanism of Bioluminescence, Chemi-Luminescence and Enzyme Function in the Oxidation of Firefly Luciferin". Photochemistry and Photobiology. 10 (3): 153–170. doi:10.1111/j.1751-1097.1969.tb05676.x. PMID 5824751. S2CID 45093683.
- White, Emil H.; Rapaport, Eliezer; Seliger, Howard H.; Hopkins, Thomas A. (1971). "The chemi- and bioluminescence of firefly luciferin: An efficient chemical production of electronically excited states". Bioorganic Chemistry. 1 (1–2): 92–122. doi:10.1016/0045-2068(71)90009-5.
- Lee, J.; Seliger, H. H. (1972). "Quantum Yields of the Luminol Chemiluminescence Reaction in Aqueous and Aprotic Solvents". Photochemistry and Photobiology. 15 (2): 227–237. doi:10.1111/j.1751-1097.1972.tb06241.x. S2CID 97380031.
- Tyler, Mary Altalo; Seliger, H. H. (1978). "Annual subsurface transport of a red tide dinoflagellate to its bloom area: Water circulation patterns and organism distributions in the Chesapeake Bay 1". Limnology and Oceanography. 23 (2): 227–246. Bibcode:1978LimOc..23..227T. doi:10.4319/lo.1978.23.2.0227.
- Seliger, H.H; Boggs, J.A; Biggley, W.H (1985). "Catastrophic Anoxia in the Chesapeake Bay in 1984". Science. 228 (4695): 70–73. Bibcode:1985Sci...228...70S. doi:10.1126/science.228.4695.70. PMID 17811570.
- Wood, K.; Lam, Y.; Seliger, H.; McElroy, W. (1989). "Complementary DNA coding click beetle luciferases can elicit bioluminescence of different colors". Science. 244 (4905): 700–702. Bibcode:1989Sci...244..700W. doi:10.1126/science.2655091. PMID 2655091.

=== Books ===
- Seliger, Howard H.; McElroy, William D. (22 October 2013). Light: Physical and Biological Action. Academic Press. ISBN 9781483270739; original printing 1965
