= Umbellula encrinus =

Scientific classification
- Kingdom: Animalia
- Phylum: Cnidaria
- Subphylum: Anthozoa
- Class: Octocorallia
- Order: Scleralcyonacea
- Family: Umbellulidae
- Genus: Umbellula
- Species: U. encrinus

Binomial name
- Umbellula encrinus (Linnaeus, 1758)

Species of sea pen

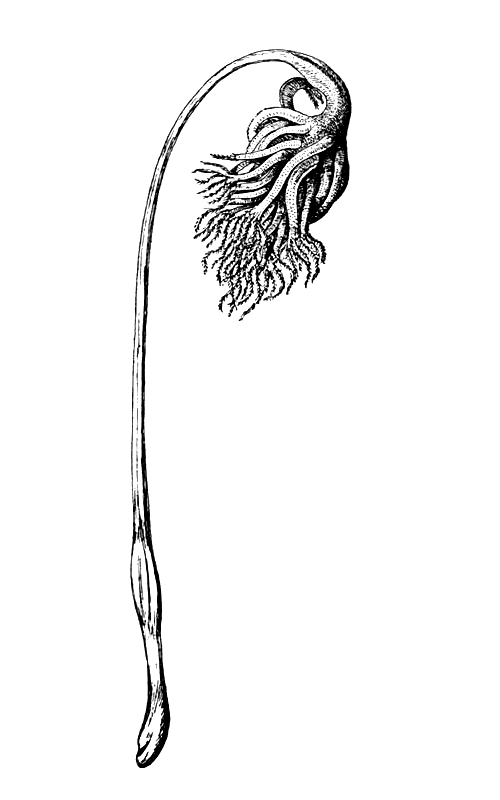
Umbellula encrinus drawing, 1920

Umbellula encrinus is a species of deep-water sea pen described by Carl Linnaeus in 1758, and is part of the cnidarian genus Umbellula.

== Description ==
Commonly found in the deep ocean of the eastern Canadian Arctic, this species of sea pen is often caught as bycatch when fishing. Colonies of this species, similar to most Umbellula, have a strong muscular peduncle to anchor themselves in soft substrate, and can reach heights of >2 m. The peduncle is followed by an elongated, thin stalk, with a distal crown of polyps. The organism is supported by an internal, calcified skeleton. U. encrinus has a long lifespan, which is similar to other octocorals of approximately 70 years. Age is determined by analyzing the number of rings inside the organism's skeleton.

== Distribution ==
Umbellula encrinus has been primarily found in the eastern Canadian Arctic. Colonies are particularly dense in Baffin Bay, in between Canada and Greenland. Some have also been reported in the Mid-Atlantic Ridge near the Canadian province of Newfoundland, in Norwegian waters, and the Barents Sea.

Lancaster Sound in Baffin Bay was found to be a particularly populated area for U. encrinus. The high rate of primary productivity in this area suggests that U. encrinus thrives in areas where there is a significant energy source, however growth is mainly intrinsically motivated.

U. encrinus has been recorded on both dominantly soft and dominantly hard bottom environments.

== Reproduction ==
Umbellula encrinus is a gonochoric species with an equal sex ratio and broadcast-spawning strategy. There is no embryonic or larval stages of development in the organisms polyps before or after the spawning period. All polyps of the sea pen contain gametes, suggesting that the polyps are used for feeding, reproduction, and water cycling.

Gametogenesis primarily occurs during high phytoplankton production, which is during the summer months. However, there are mature gametes in male and female colonies after the spring melt, suggesting maturation can also occur under the ice.

Depth and latitude of a colony can also affect fecundity and gamete development. Where at greater depths and higher latitudes, more fertile colonies are found.

== Vulnerability and conservation ==
The slow radial growth rates alongside long lifespan of Umbellula encrinus has led to long recovery times concerning physical damage. Furthermore, it is not uncommon for U. encrinus to be caught via trawl bycatch or longline hooks.

While scientists are starting to examine the impacts of longline hooks on deep-sea coral colonies, this cannot be said for sea pens. A lack of general knowledge of the exact distribution of U. encrinus also plays a part in the unknown nature of just how impactful longline hooks are on this species.
