= Bioluminescence =

Emission of light by a living organism

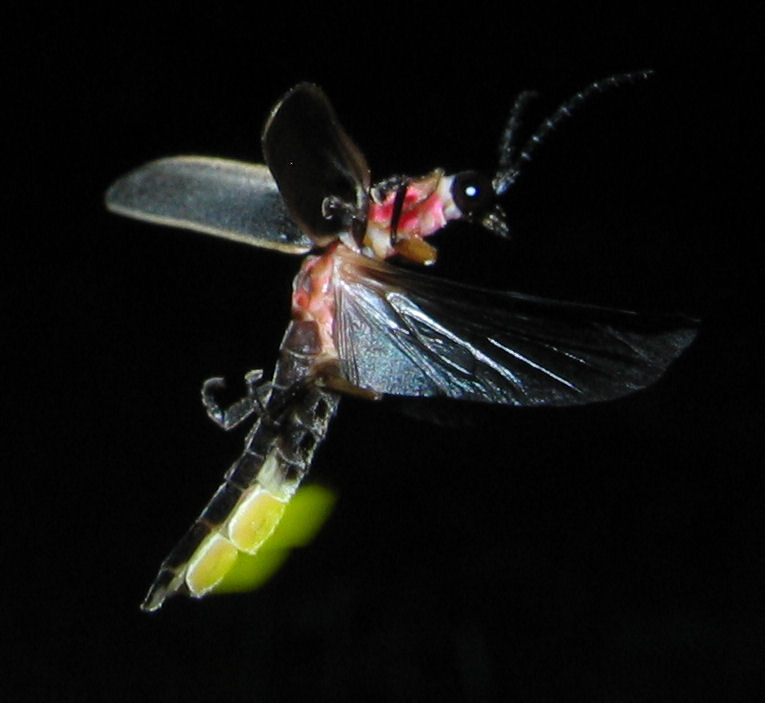
Flying and glowing firefly, Photinus pyralis

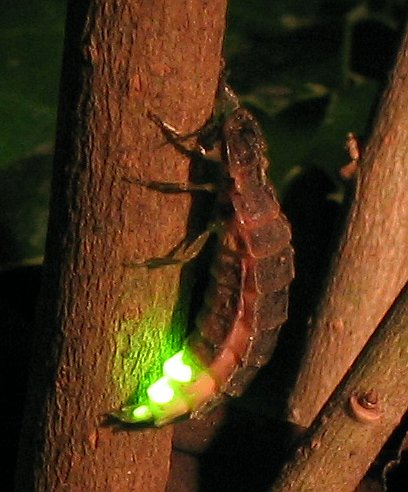
Female glowworm, Lampyris noctiluca

Bioluminescence is the production of light by an organism as the result of a chemiluminescence reaction. It occurs in a wide variety of organisms, including marine vertebrates and invertebrates, terrestrial arthropods such as fireflies, some fungi, and microorganisms such as some bacteria and dinoflagellates. In some animals, the light is bacteriogenic, produced by symbiotic bacteria such as those from the genus Vibrio; in others, it is autogenic, produced by the animals themselves. Bioluminescence has evolved independently at least 94 times, first emerging in octocorals some 540 million years ago.

In most cases, the principal chemical reaction in bioluminescence involves the reaction of a substrate called luciferin and an enzyme, called luciferase. Because these are generic names, luciferins and luciferases are often distinguished by the species or group, e.g. firefly luciferin or cypridina luciferin. In all characterized cases, the enzyme catalyzes the oxidation of the luciferin resulting in excited state oxyluciferin, which is the light emitter of the reaction. Upon their decay to the ground state they emit visible light.

In some species, the luciferase requires other cofactors, such as calcium or magnesium ions, and sometimes also the energy-carrying molecule adenosine triphosphate (ATP). In evolution, luciferins vary little: one in particular, coelenterazine, is found in 11 different animal phyla, though in some of these, the animals obtain it through their diet. Conversely, luciferases vary widely between different species. Bioluminescence has arisen over 40 times in evolutionary history.

Both Aristotle and Pliny the Elder mention that damp wood sometimes gives off a glow. Many centuries later Robert Boyle showed that oxygen was involved in the process, in wood, fish, and glowworms. It was not until the late nineteenth century that bioluminescence was properly investigated. The phenomenon is widely distributed among animal groups, especially in marine environments. On land it occurs in fungi, bacteria and some groups of invertebrates, including insects.

The uses of bioluminescence by animals include counterillumination camouflage, mimicry of other animals, for example to lure prey, and signaling to other individuals of the same species, such as to attract mates. In the laboratory, luciferase-based systems are used in genetic engineering and biomedical research.

== History ==
Before the development of the safety lamp for use in coal mines, dried fish skins were used in Britain and Europe as a weak source of light. This experimental form of illumination avoided the necessity of using candles which risked sparking explosions of firedamp. In 1920, the American zoologist E. Newton Harvey published a monograph, The Nature of Animal Light, summarizing early work on bioluminescence. Harvey notes that Aristotle mentions light produced by dead fish and flesh, and that both Aristotle and Pliny the Elder (in his Natural History) mention light from damp wood. He records that Robert Boyle experimented on these light sources, and showed that both they and the glowworm require air for light to be produced. Harvey notes that in 1753, J. Baker identified the flagellate Noctiluca "as a luminous animal" "just visible to the naked eye", and in 1854 Johann Florian Heller (1813–1871) identified strands (hyphae) of fungi as the source of light in dead wood.

James Hingston Tuckey, in his posthumous 1818 Narrative of the Expedition to the Zaire, described catching the animals responsible for luminescence. He mentions pellucida, crustaceans (to which he ascribes the milky whiteness of the water), and cancers (shrimps and crabs). Under the microscope he described the "luminous property" to be in the brain, resembling "a most brilliant amethyst about the size of a large pin's head".

Charles Darwin noticed bioluminescence in the sea, describing it in his Journal:

While sailing in these latitudes on one very dark night, the sea presented a wonderful and most beautiful spectacle. There was a fresh breeze, and every part of the surface, which during the day is seen as foam, now glowed with a pale light. The vessel drove before her bows two billows of liquid phosphorus, and in her wake she was followed by a milky train. As far as the eye reached, the crest of every wave was bright, and the sky above the horizon, from the reflected glare of these livid flames, was not so utterly obscure, as over the rest of the heavens.

Darwin also observed a luminous "jelly-fish of the genus Dianaea", noting that: "When the waves scintillate with bright green sparks, I believe it is generally owing to minute crustacea. But there can be no doubt that very many other pelagic animals, when alive, are phosphorescent." He guessed that "a disturbed electrical condition of the atmosphere" was probably responsible. Daniel Pauly comments that Darwin "was lucky with most of his guesses, but not here", noting that biochemistry was too little known, and that the complex evolution of the marine animals involved "would have been too much for comfort".

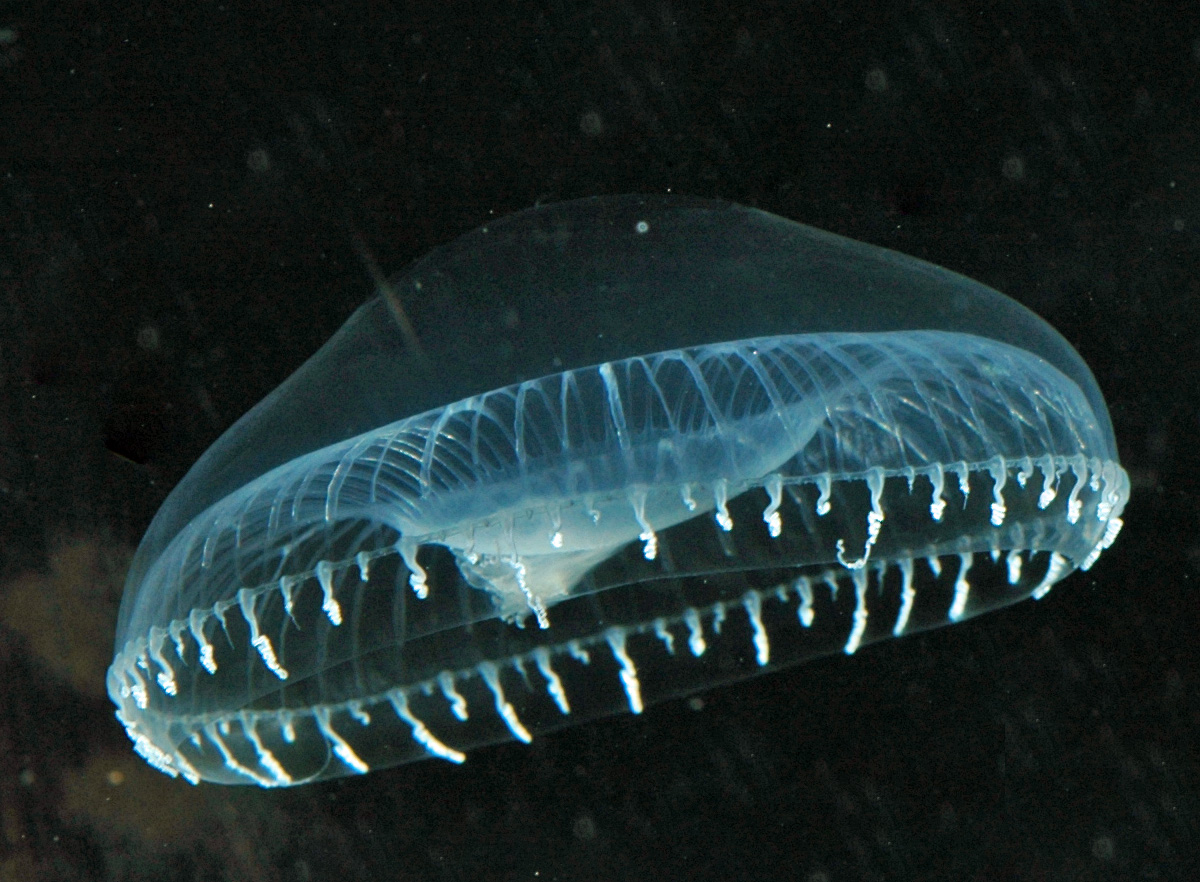
Osamu Shimomura isolated the photoprotein aequorin and its cofactor coelenterazine from the crystal jelly Aequorea victoria in 1961.

Bioluminescence attracted the attention of the United States Navy in the Cold War, since submarines in some waters can create a bright enough wake to be detected; a German submarine was sunk in the First World War, having been detected in this way. The Navy was interested in predicting when such detection would be possible, and hence guiding their own submarines to avoid detection.

Among the anecdotes of navigation by bioluminescence is one recounted by the Apollo 13 astronaut Jim Lovell, who as a Navy pilot had found his way back to his aircraft carrier USS Shangri-La when his navigation systems failed. Turning off his cabin lights, he saw the glowing wake of the ship, and was able to fly to it and land safely.

The French pharmacologist Raphaël Dubois carried out work on bioluminescence in the late nineteenth century. He studied click beetles (Pyrophorus) and the marine bivalve mollusc Pholas dactylus. He refuted the old idea that bioluminescence came from phosphorus, (Note: However, the name 'phosphorus', as used in the 17th century, did not necessarily mean the modern element; any substance that glowed by itself could be given this name, meaning "light bearer".) and demonstrated that the process was related to the oxidation of a specific compound, which he named luciferin, by an enzyme. He sent Harvey siphons from the mollusc preserved in sugar. Harvey had become interested in bioluminescence as a result of visiting the South Pacific and Japan and observing phosphorescent organisms there. He studied the phenomenon for many years. His research aimed to demonstrate that luciferin, and the enzymes that act on it to produce light, were interchangeable between species, showing that all bioluminescent organisms had a common ancestor. However, he found this hypothesis to be false, with different organisms having major differences in the composition of their light-producing proteins. He spent the next 30 years purifying and studying the components, but it fell to the young Japanese chemist Osamu Shimomura to be the first to obtain crystalline luciferin. He used the sea firefly Vargula hilgendorfii, but it was another ten years before he discovered the chemical's structure and published his 1957 paper Crystalline Cypridina Luciferin. Shimomura, Martin Chalfie, and Roger Y. Tsien won the 2008 Nobel Prize in Chemistry for their 1961 discovery and development of green fluorescent protein as a tool for biological research.

Harvey wrote a detailed historical account on all forms of luminescence in 1957. An updated book on bioluminescence covering also the twentieth and early twenty-first century was published recently.

== Evolution ==
In 1932 E. N. Harvey was among the first to propose how bioluminescence could have evolved. In this early paper, he suggested that proto-bioluminescence could have arisen from respiratory chain proteins that hold fluorescent groups. This hypothesis has since been disproven, but it did lead to considerable interest in the origins of the phenomenon. Today, the two prevailing hypotheses (both concerning marine bioluminescence) are those put forth by Howard Seliger in 1993 and Rees et al. in 1998.

Seliger's theory identifies luciferase enzymes as the catalyst for the evolution of bioluminescent systems. It suggests that the original purpose of luciferases was as mixed-function oxygenases. As the early ancestors of many species moved into deeper and darker waters natural selection favored the development of increased eye sensitivity and enhanced visual signals. If selection were to favor a mutation in the oxygenase enzyme required for the breakdown of pigment molecules (molecules often associated with spots used to attract a mate or distract a predator) it could have eventually resulted in external luminescence in tissues.

Rees et al. use evidence gathered from the marine luciferin coelenterazine to suggest that selection acting on luciferins may have arisen from pressures to protect oceanic organisms from potentially deleterious reactive oxygen species (e.g. H_{2}O_{2} and O_{2}^{−} ). The functional shift from antioxidation to bioluminescence probably occurred when the strength of selection for antioxidation defense decreased as early species moved further down the water column. At greater depths exposure to ROS is significantly lower, as is the endogenous production of ROS through metabolism.

While popular at first, Seliger's theory has been challenged, particularly on the biochemical and genetic evidence that Rees examines. What remains clear, however, is that bioluminescence has evolved independently at least 40 times. Bioluminescence in fish began at least by the Cretaceous period. About 1,500 fish species are known to be bioluminescent; the capability evolved independently at least 27 times. Of these, 17 involved the taking up of bioluminous bacteria from the surrounding water while in the others, the intrinsic light evolved through chemical synthesis. These fish have become surprisingly diverse in the deep ocean and control their light with the help of their nervous system, using it not just to lure prey or hide from predators, but also for communication.

All bioluminescent organisms have in common that the reaction of a "luciferin" and oxygen is catalyzed by a luciferase to produce light. McElroy and Seliger proposed in 1962 that the bioluminescent reaction evolved to detoxify oxygen, in parallel with photosynthesis.

Bioluminescence has evolved independently at least 94 times, first emerging in octocorals some 540 million years ago. It has evolved independently 27 times within the ray-finned fishes. The oldest of these appear to be Stomiiformes and Myctophidae. In sharks, it has evolved only once. Genomic analysis of octocorals indicates that their ancestor was bioluminescent as long as 540 million years ago.

== Chemical mechanism ==
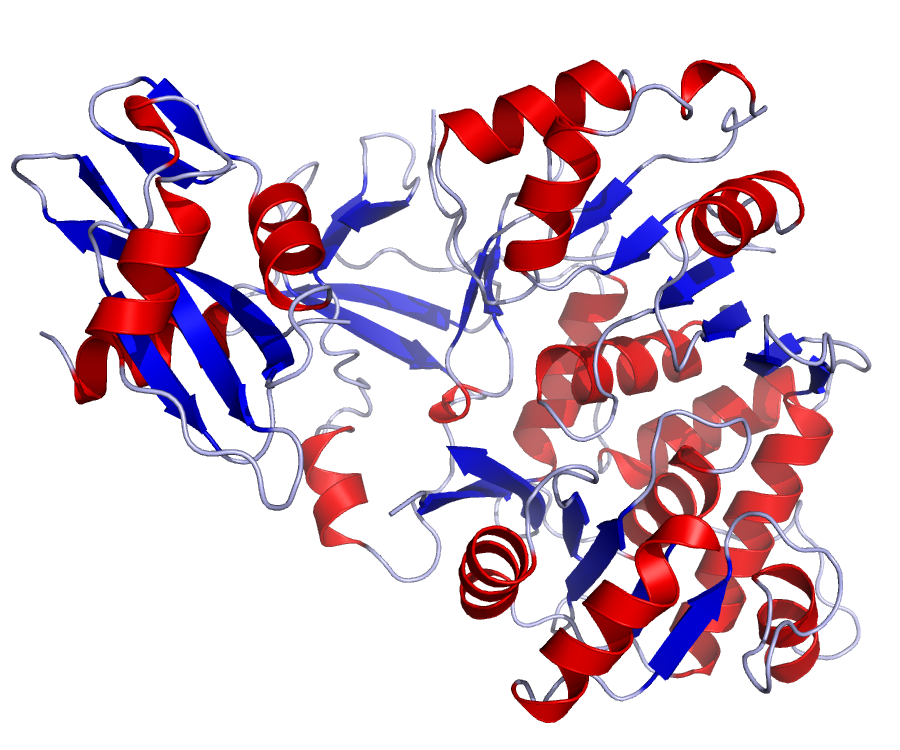
Protein structure of the luciferase of the firefly Photinus pyralis. The enzyme is a much larger molecule than luciferin.

Bioluminescence is a form of chemiluminescence where light energy is released by a chemical reaction. This reaction involves a light-emitting pigment, the luciferin, and a luciferase, the enzyme component. Because of the diversity of luciferin/luciferase combinations, there are very few commonalities in the chemical mechanism. From currently studied systems, a unifying mechanism is the role of molecular oxygen; often there is a concurrent release of carbon dioxide (CO_{2}). For example, the firefly luciferin/luciferase reaction requires magnesium and ATP and produces CO_{2}, adenosine monophosphate (AMP) and pyrophosphate (PP) as waste products. Other cofactors may be required, such as calcium (Ca^{2+}) for the photoprotein aequorin, or magnesium (Mg^{2+}) ions and ATP for the firefly luciferase. The production of the excited state molecules always involves the decomposition of organic peroxides. Generically, the luciferin/luciferase reaction can be described as:

Luciferin + O_{2}$\ce{->[\text{Luciferase}][\text{other cofactors}]}$Oxyluciferin + light energy

Coelenterazine is a luciferin found in many different marine phyla from comb jellies to vertebrates. Like all luciferins, it is oxidised to produce light.

Instead of a luciferase, the jellyfish Aequorea victoria makes use of another type of protein called a photoprotein, in this case specifically aequorin. When calcium ions are added, rapid catalysis creates a brief flash quite unlike the prolonged glow produced by luciferase. In a second, much slower step, luciferin is regenerated from the oxidized (oxyluciferin) form, allowing it to recombine with aequorin, in preparation for a subsequent flash. Photoproteins are thus enzymes, but with unusual reaction kinetics. Furthermore, some of the blue light released by aequorin in contact with calcium ions is absorbed by a green fluorescent protein, which in turn releases green light in a process called resonant energy transfer.

In evolution, luciferins tend to vary little: one in particular, coelenterazine, is the light emitting pigment for nine phyla (groups of very different organisms), including polycystine radiolaria, Cercozoa (Phaeodaria), protozoa, comb jellies, cnidaria including jellyfish and corals, crustaceans, molluscs, arrow worms and vertebrates (ray-finned fish). Not all these organisms synthesise coelenterazine: some of them obtain it through their diet. Conversely, luciferase enzymes vary widely and tend to be different in each species.

== Distribution ==
Huge numbers of dinoflagellates creating bioluminescence in breaking waves

Bioluminescence occurs widely among animals, especially in the open sea, including fish, jellyfish, comb jellies, crustaceans, and cephalopod molluscs; in some fungi and bacteria; and in various terrestrial invertebrates, nearly all of which are beetles. In marine coastal habitats, about 2.5% of organisms are estimated to be bioluminescent, whereas in pelagic habitats in the eastern Pacific, about 76% of the main taxa of deep-sea animals have been found to be capable of producing light. More than 700 animal genera have been recorded with light-producing species. Most marine light-emission is in the blue and green light spectrum. However, some loose-jawed fish emit red and infrared light, and the genus Tomopteris emits yellow light.

The most frequently encountered bioluminescent organisms may be the dinoflagellates in the surface layers of the sea, which are responsible for the sparkling luminescence sometimes seen at night in disturbed water. At least 18 genera of these phytoplankton exhibit luminosity. Luminescent dinoflagellate ecosystems are present in warm water lagoons and bays with narrow openings to the ocean. A different effect is the thousands of square miles of the ocean which shine with the light produced by bioluminescent bacteria, known as mareel or the milky seas effect.

=== Pelagic zone ===
Bioluminescence is abundant in the pelagic zone, with the most concentration at depths devoid of light and surface waters at night. These organisms participate in diurnal vertical migration from the dark depths to the surface at night, dispersing the population of bioluminescent organisms across the pelagic water column. The dispersal of bioluminescence across different depths in the pelagic zone has been attributed to the selection pressures imposed by predation and the lack of places to hide in the open sea. In depths where sunlight never penetrates, often below 200m, the significance of bioluminescence is evident in the retention of functional eyes for animals to detect light emitted by other organisms.

==== Bacterial symbioses ====
Organisms often produce bioluminescence themselves, rarely do they generate it from outside phenomena. However, there are occasions where bioluminescence is produced by bacterial symbionts that have a symbiotic relationship with the host organism. Although many luminous bacteria in the marine environment are free-living, a majority are found in symbiotic relationships that involve fish, squids, crustaceans etc. as hosts. Most luminous bacteria inhabit the sea, dominated by Photobacterium and Vibrio.

In the symbiotic relationship, bacterium benefit from having a source of nourishment and a refuge to grow. Hosts obtain these bacterial symbionts either from the environment, spawning, or the luminous bacterium is evolving with their host. Coevolutionary interactions are suggested as host organisms' anatomical adaptations have become specific to only certain luminous bacteria, to suffice ecological dependence of bioluminescence.

=== Benthic zone ===
Bioluminescence is widely studied amongst species located in the mesopelagic zone, but the benthic zone at mesopelagic depths has remained widely unknown. Benthic habitats at depths beyond the mesopelagic are also poorly understood due to the same constraints. Unlike the pelagic zone where the emission of light is undisturbed in the open sea, the occurrence of bioluminescence in the benthic zone is less common. It has been attributed to the blockage of emitted light by a number of sources such as the sea floor, and inorganic and organic structures. Visual signals and communication that is prevalent in the pelagic zone such as counter-illumination may not be functional or relevant in the benthic realm. Bioluminescence in bathyal benthic species still remains poorly studied due to difficulties of the collection of species at these depths.

== Uses in nature ==
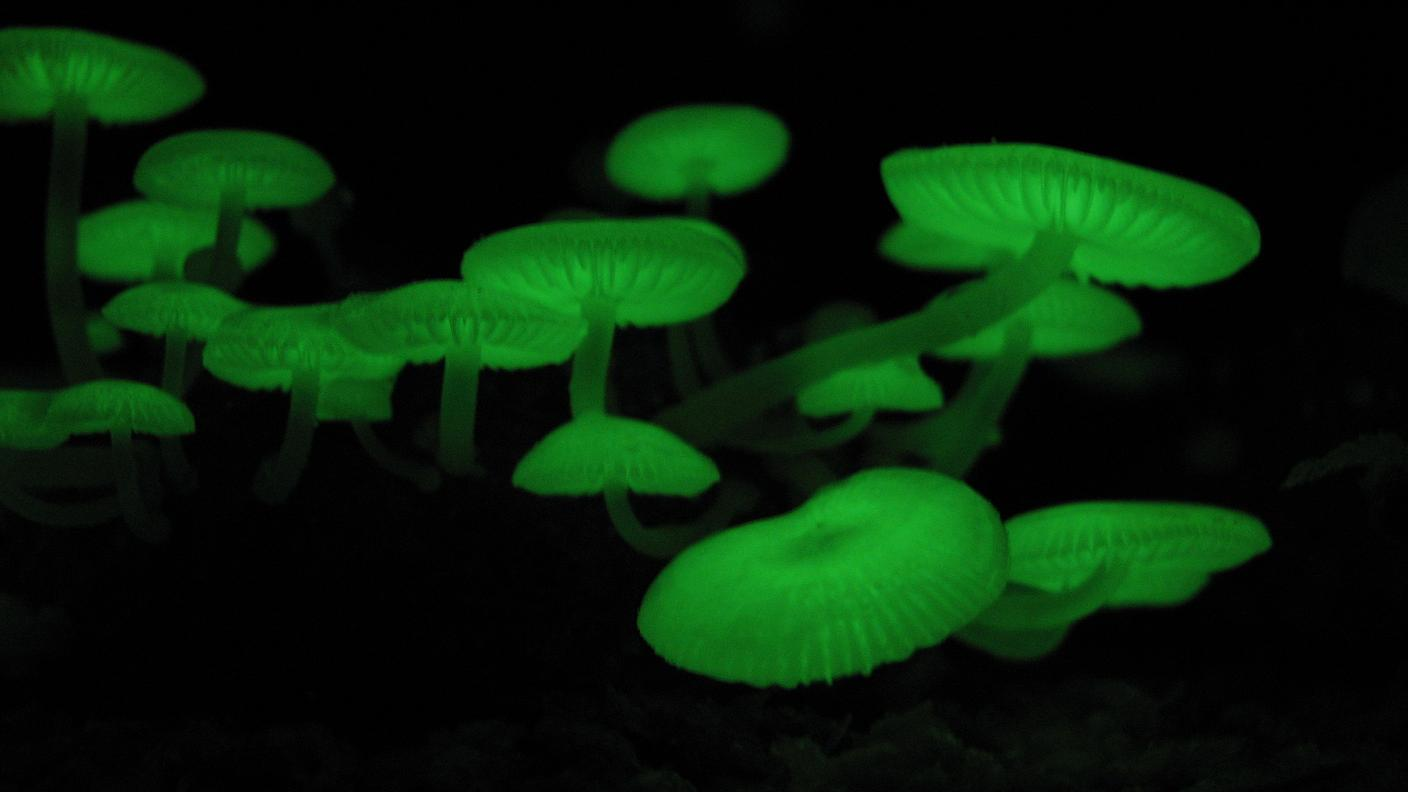
Mycena chlorophos, a bioluminescent mushroom.

Bioluminescence has several functions in different taxa. Steven Haddock et al. (2010) list as more or less definite functions in marine organisms the following: defensive functions of startle, counterillumination (camouflage), misdirection (smoke screen), distractive body parts, burglar alarm (making predators easier for higher predators to see), and warning to deter settlers; offensive functions of lure, stun or confuse prey, illuminate prey, and mate attraction/recognition. It is much easier for researchers to detect that a species is able to produce light than to analyze the chemical mechanisms or to prove what function the light serves. In some cases the function is unknown, as with species in three families of earthworm (Oligochaeta), such as Diplocardia longa, where the coelomic fluid produces light when the animal moves. The following functions are reasonably well established in the named organisms.

=== Counterillumination camouflage ===
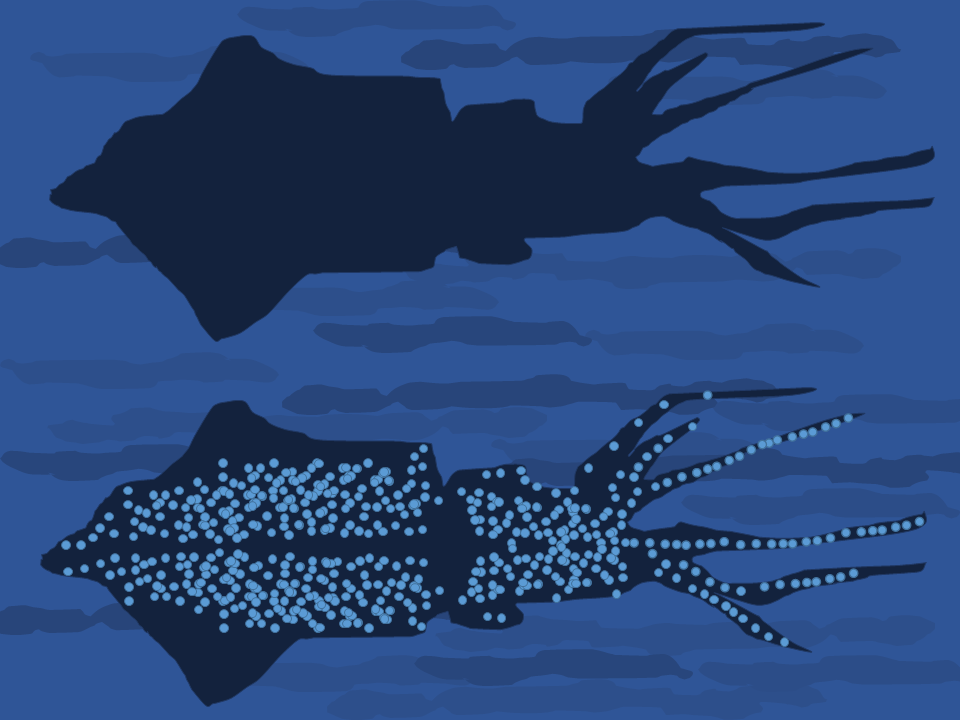
Principle of counterillumination camouflage in firefly squid, Watasenia scintillans. When seen from below by a predator, the bioluminescence helps to match the squid's brightness and color to the sea surface above.

In many animals of the deep sea, including several squid species, bacterial bioluminescence is used for camouflage by counterillumination, in which the animal matches the overhead environmental light as seen from below. In these animals, photoreceptors control the illumination to match the brightness of the background. These light organs are usually separate from the tissue containing the bioluminescent bacteria. However, in one species, Euprymna scolopes, the bacteria are an integral component of the animal's light organ.

=== Attraction ===
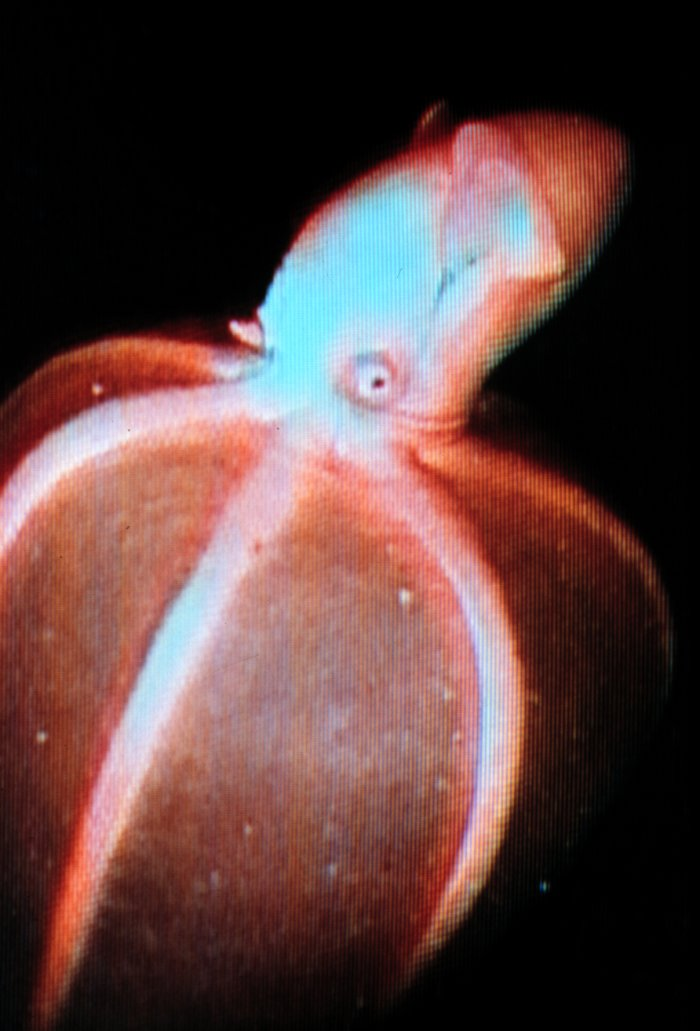
Stauroteuthis syrtensis, bioluminescent photophores

Bioluminescence is used in a variety of ways and for different purposes. The cirrate octopod Stauroteuthis syrtensis uses emits bioluminescence from its sucker like structures. These structures are believed to have evolved from what are more commonly known as octopus suckers. They do not have the same function as the normal suckers because they no longer have any handling or grappling ability due its evolution of photophores. The placement of the photophores are within the animals oral reach, which leads researchers to suggest that it uses it bioluminescence to capture and lure prey.

Fireflies use light to attract mates. Two systems are involved according to species; in one, females emit light from their abdomens to attract males; in the other, flying males emit signals to which the sometimes sedentary females respond. Click beetles emit an orange light from the abdomen when flying and a green light from the thorax when they are disturbed or moving about on the ground. The former is probably a sexual attractant but the latter may be defensive. Larvae of the click beetle Pyrophorus nyctophanus live in the surface layers of termite mounds in Brazil. They light up the mounds by emitting a bright greenish glow which attracts the flying insects on which they feed.

In the marine environment, use of luminescence for mate attraction is chiefly known among ostracods, small shrimp-like crustaceans, especially in the family Cyprididae. Pheromones may be used for long-distance communication, with bioluminescence used at close range to enable mates to "home in". A polychaete worm, the Bermuda fireworm creates a brief display, a few nights after the full moon, when the female lights up to attract males.

=== Defense ===
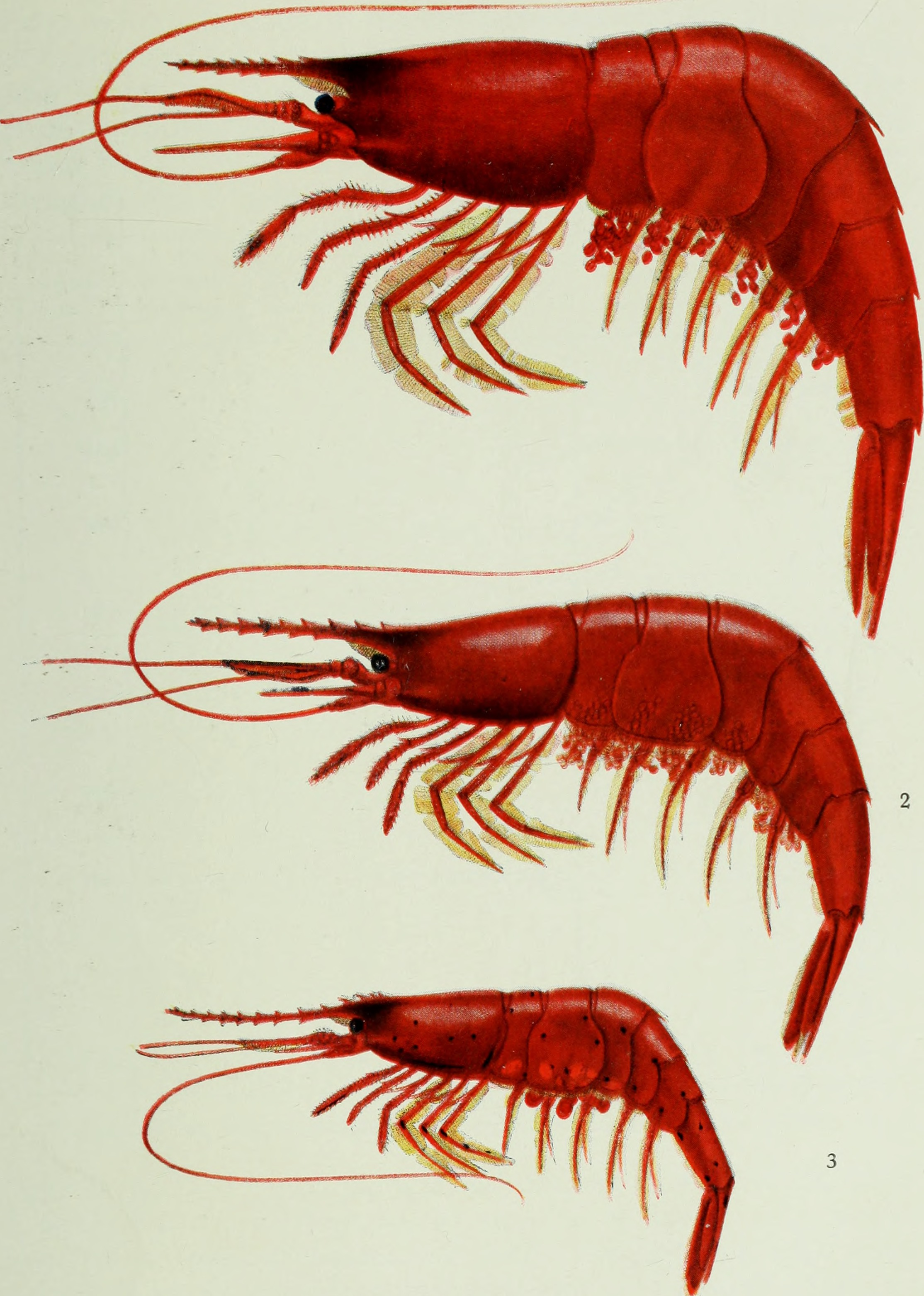
Acanthephyra purpurea has photophores along its body which it uses in defense against predators.

The defense mechanisms for bioluminescent organisms can come in multiple forms; startling prey, counter-illumination, smoke screen or misdirection, distractive body parts, burglar alarm, sacrificial tag or warning coloration. The shrimp family Oplophoridae Dana use their bioluminescence as a way of startling the predator that is after them. Acanthephyra purpurea, within the Oplophoridae family, uses its photophores to emit light, and can secrete a bioluminescent substance when in the presence of a predator. This secretory mechanism is common among prey fish.

Many cephalopods, including at least 70 genera of squid, are bioluminescent. Some squid and small crustaceans use bioluminescent chemical mixtures or bacterial slurries in the same way as many squid use ink. A cloud of luminescent material is expelled, distracting or repelling a potential predator, while the animal escapes to safety. The deep sea squid Octopoteuthis deletron may autotomize portions of its arms which are luminous and continue to twitch and flash, thus distracting a predator while the animal flees.

Dinoflagellates may use bioluminescence for defense against predators. However, the specific explanation as to why predators are deterred by bioluminescence is still debated. Dinoflagellates shine when they detect a predator, possibly making the predator itself more vulnerable by attracting the attention of predators from higher trophic levels (better known as the "burglar alarm hypothesis"). Other possibilities include using bioluminescence to disorient predators or as an aposematic signal to warn of possible toxicity.Grazing copepods release any phytoplankton cells that flash, unharmed; if they were eaten they would make the copepods glow, attracting predators, so the phytoplankton's bioluminescence is defensive. The problem of shining stomach contents is solved (and the explanation corroborated) in predatory deep-sea fishes: their stomachs have a black lining able to keep the light from any bioluminescent fish prey which they have swallowed from attracting larger predators.

The sea-firefly is a small crustacean living in sediment. At rest it emits a dull glow but when disturbed it darts away leaving a cloud of shimmering blue light to confuse the predator. During World War II it was gathered and dried for use by the Japanese army as a source of light during clandestine operations.

The larvae of railroad worms (Phrixothrix) have paired photic organs on each body segment, able to glow with green light; these are thought to have a defensive purpose. They also have organs on the head which produce red light; they are the only terrestrial organisms to emit light of this color.

=== Warning ===
Aposematism is a widely used function of bioluminescence, providing a warning that the creature concerned is unpalatable. It is suggested that many firefly larvae glow to repel predators; some millipedes glow for the same purpose. Some marine organisms are believed to emit light for a similar reason. These include scale worms, jellyfish and brittle stars but further research is needed to fully establish the function of the luminescence. Such a mechanism would be of particular advantage to soft-bodied cnidarians if they were able to deter predation in this way. The limpet Latia neritoides is the only known freshwater gastropod that emits light. It produces greenish luminescent mucus which may have an anti-predator function. The marine snail Hinea brasiliana uses flashes of light, probably to deter predators. The blue-green light is emitted through the translucent shell, which functions as an efficient diffuser of light.

=== Communication ===
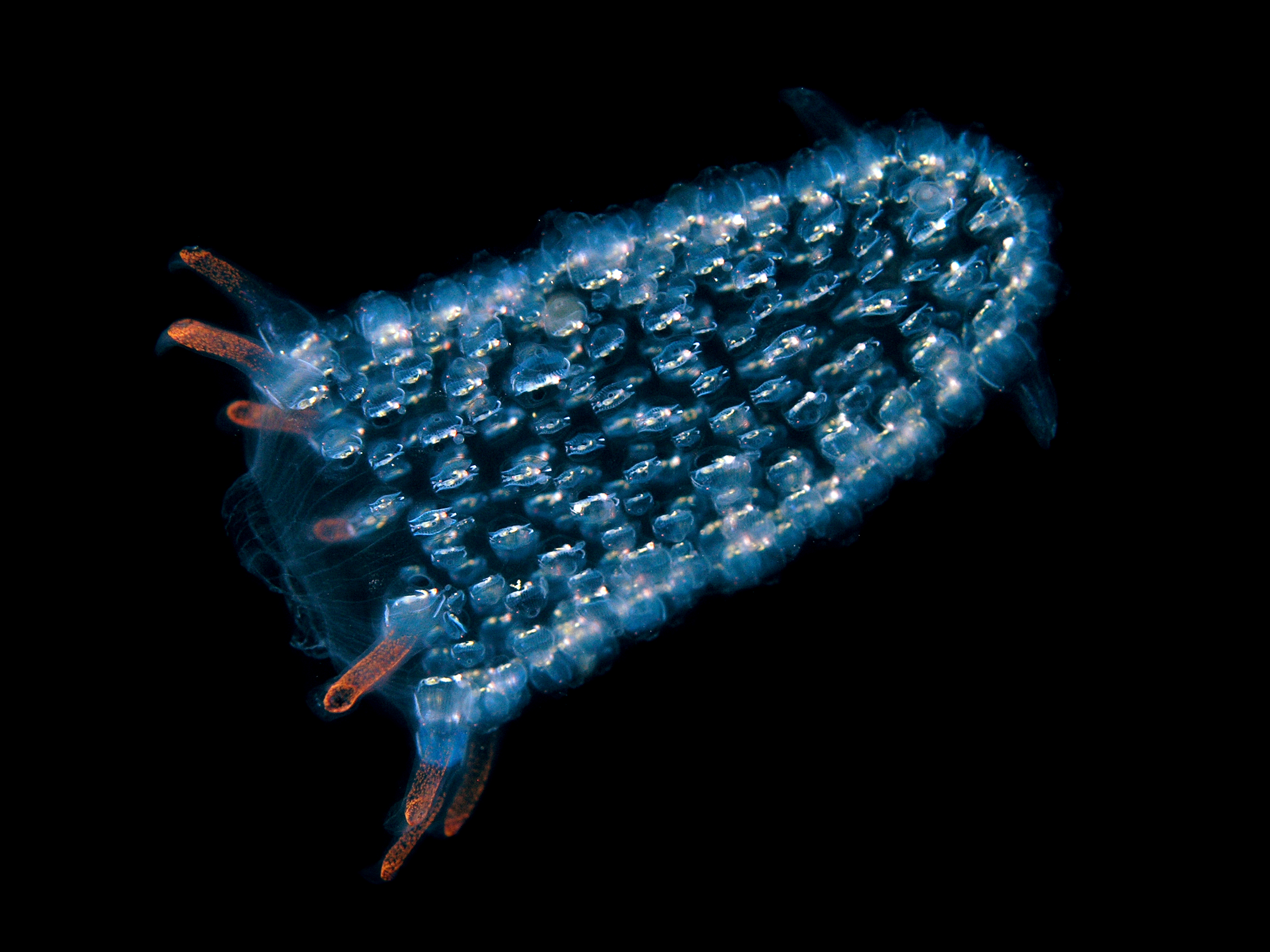
Pyrosoma, a colonial tunicate; each individual zooid in the colony flashes a blue-green light.

Communication in the form of quorum sensing plays a role in the regulation of luminescence in many species of bacteria. Small extracellularly secreted molecules stimulate the bacteria to turn on genes for light production when cell density, measured by concentration of the secreted molecules, is high.

Pyrosomes are colonial tunicates and each zooid has a pair of luminescent organs on either side of the inlet siphon. When stimulated by light, these turn on and off, causing rhythmic flashing. No neural pathway runs between the zooids, but each responds to the light produced by other individuals, and even to light from other nearby colonies. Communication by light emission between the zooids enables coordination of colony effort, for example in swimming where each zooid provides part of the propulsive force.

Some bioluminous bacteria infect nematodes that parasitize Lepidoptera larvae. When these caterpillars die, their luminosity may attract predators to the dead insect thus assisting in the dispersal of both bacteria and nematodes. A similar reason may account for the many species of fungi that emit light. Species in the genera Armillaria, Mycena, Omphalotus, Panellus, Pleurotus and others do this, emitting usually greenish light from the mycelium, cap and gills. This may attract night-flying insects and aid in spore dispersal, but other functions may also be involved.

Quantula striata is the only known bioluminescent terrestrial mollusk. Pulses of light are emitted from a gland near the front of the foot and may have a communicative function, although the adaptive significance is not fully understood.

=== Mimicry ===
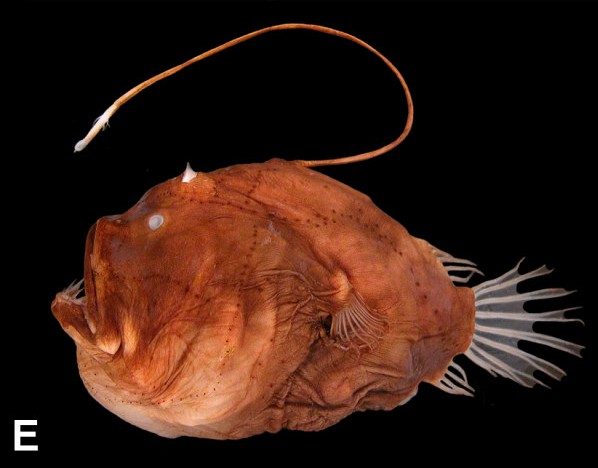
A deep sea anglerfish, Bufoceratias wedli, showing the esca (lure)

Bioluminescence is used by a variety of animals to mimic other species. Many species of deep sea fish such as the anglerfish and dragonfish make use of aggressive mimicry to attract prey. They have an appendage on their heads called an esca that contains bioluminescent bacteria able to produce a long-lasting glow which the fish can control. The glowing esca is dangled or waved about to lure small animals to within striking distance of the fish.

The cookiecutter shark uses bioluminescence to camouflage its underside by counter-illumination, but a small patch near its pectoral fins remains dark, appearing as a small fish to large predatory fish like tuna and mackerel swimming beneath it. When such fish approach the lure, they are bitten by the shark.

Female Photuris fireflies sometimes mimic the light pattern of another firefly, Photinus, to attract its males as prey. In this way they obtain both food and the defensive chemicals named lucibufagins, which Photuris cannot synthesize.

South American giant cockroaches of the genus Lucihormetica were believed to be the first known example of defensive mimicry, emitting light in imitation of bioluminescent, poisonous click beetles. However, doubt has been cast on this assertion, and there is no conclusive evidence that the cockroaches are bioluminescent.

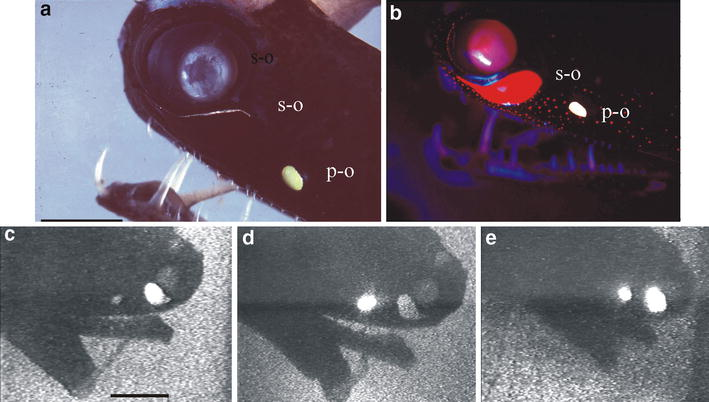
Flashing of photophores of black dragonfish, Malacosteus niger, showing red fluorescence.

=== Illumination ===
While most marine bioluminescence is green to blue, some deep sea barbeled dragonfishes in the genera Aristostomias, Pachystomias and Malacosteus emit a red glow. This adaptation allows the fish to see red-pigmented prey, which are normally invisible to other organisms in the deep ocean environment where red light has been filtered out by the water column. These fish are able to utilize the longer wavelength to act as a spotlight for its prey that only they can see. The fish may also use this light to communicate with each other to find potential mates. The ability of the fish to see this light is explained by the presence of specialized rhodopsin pigment. The mechanism of light creation is through a suborbital photophore that utilizes gland cells which produce exergonic chemical reactions that produce light with a longer, red wavelength. The dragonfish species which produce the red light also produce blue light in photophore on the dorsal area. The main function of this is to alert the fish to the presence of its prey. The additional pigment is thought to be assimilated from chlorophyll derivatives found in the copepods which form part of its diet.

The angler siphonophore (Erenna) utilizes red bioluminescence in appendages to lure fish.

== Biotechnology ==
=== Biology and medicine ===
Bioluminescent organisms are a target for many areas of research. Luciferase systems are widely used in genetic engineering as reporter genes, and for biomedical research using bioluminescence imaging. For example, the firefly luciferase gene was used as early as 1986 for research using transgenic tobacco plants. Vibrio bacteria symbiose with marine invertebrates such as the Hawaiian bobtail squid (Euprymna scolopes), are key experimental models for bioluminescence. Bioluminescent activated destruction is an experimental cancer treatment.

=== Light production ===
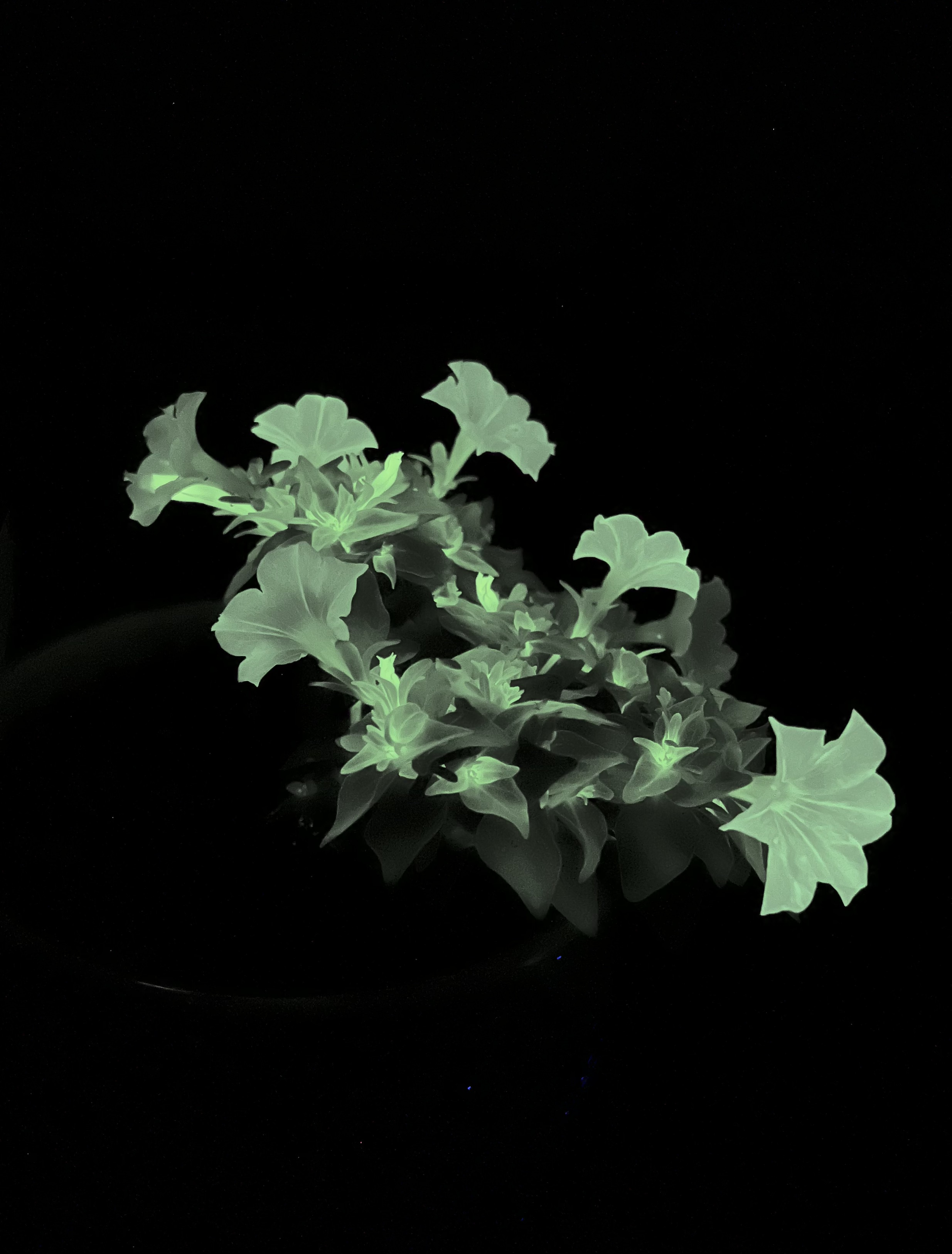
A "Firefly" Petunia, genetically engineered to produce luciferase.

The structures of photophores, the light producing organs in bioluminescent organisms, are being investigated by industrial designers. Engineered bioluminescence could perhaps one day be used to reduce the need for street lighting, or for decorative purposes if it becomes possible to produce light that is both bright enough and can be sustained for long periods at a workable price. The gene that makes the tails of fireflies glow has been added to mustard plants. The plants glow faintly for an hour when touched, but a sensitive camera is needed to see the glow. University of Wisconsin–Madison is researching the use of genetically engineered bioluminescent E. coli bacteria, for use as bioluminescent bacteria in a light bulb. In 2011, Philips demonstrated a microbial system for ambience lighting in the home. An iGEM team from Cambridge (England) has started to address the problem that luciferin is consumed in the light-producing reaction by developing a genetic biotechnology part that codes for a luciferin regenerating enzyme from the North American firefly. In 2016, Glowee, a French company started selling bioluminescent lights for shop fronts and street signs, for use between 1 and 7 in the morning when the law forbids use of electricity for this purpose. They used the bioluminescent bacterium Aliivibrio fischeri, but the maximum lifetime of their product was three days. In April 2020, plants were genetically engineered to glow more brightly using genes from the bioluminescent mushroom Neonothopanus nambi to convert caffeic acid into luciferin. Another possible application is to replace chemiluminescence with bioluminescent enzymes. A Canadian company, Lux Bio, is developing long-duration bioluminescent enzymes for this purpose.

=== ATP bioluminescence ===
ATP bioluminescence is the process in which ATP is used to generate luminescence in an organism, in conjunction with other compounds such as luciferin. It proves to be a very good biosensor to test for the presence of living microbes in water. Different types of microbial populations are determined through different sets of ATP assays using other substrates and reagents. Renilla- and Gaussia-based cell viability assays use the substrate coelenterazine.

== See also ==
- Animal coloration
- Biophoton
- Fluorescence
- Life That Glows, 2016 documentary
- Phosphorescence
