= Umbellula pomona =

Scientific classification
- Kingdom: Animalia
- Phylum: Cnidaria
- Subphylum: Anthozoa
- Class: Octocorallia
- Order: Scleralcyonacea
- Family: Umbellulidae
- Genus: Umbellula
- Species: U. pomona

Binomial name
- Umbellula pomona Risaro, Williams & Lauretta, 2020

Species of sea pen

Umbellula pomona is a species of deep-water sea pen discovered in 2020 in the Mar del Plata Submarine Canyon. This species is part of Umbellula, a genus of marine cnidarians.

== Description ==
Umbellula pomona contains sclerites that differentiate it from other species of Umbellula lacking them. These sclerites vary in shape and size, between rod and spindle like, depending on the location in the body.

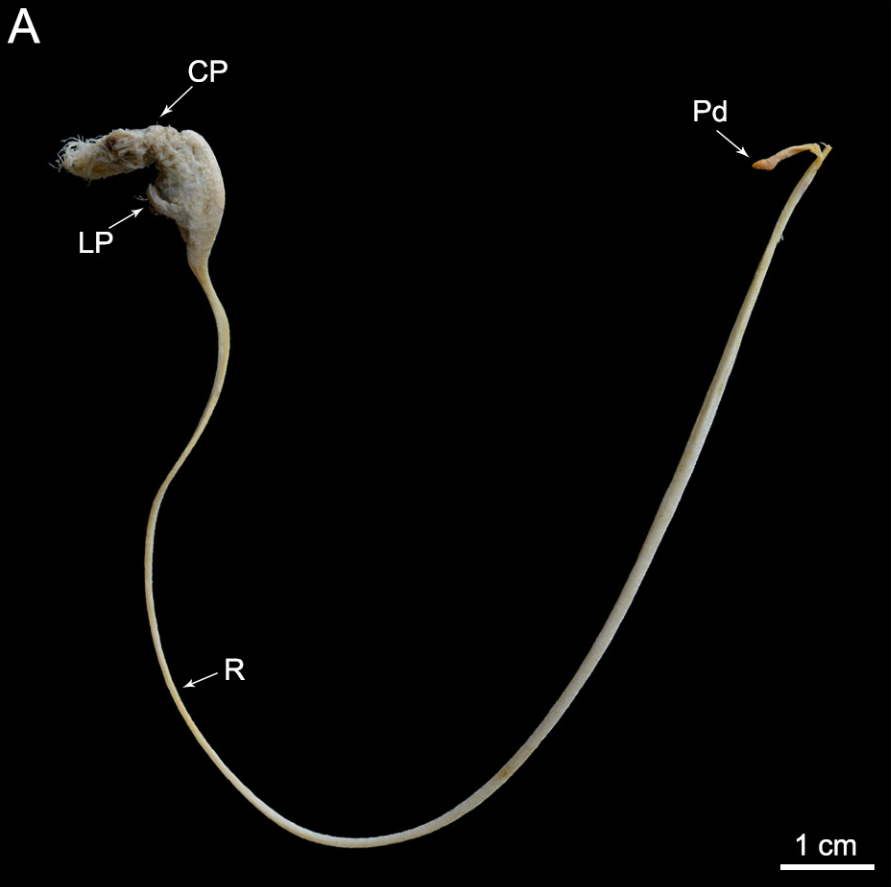
Labeled figure of an Umbellula pomona specimen

== Distribution ==
So far, Umbellula pomona has only been found in the Mar Del Plata Submarine Canyon at a depth of about 3000 m. This area of the ocean is very active, located where the Malvinas and Brazil Current meet. The interaction between the subantarctic and warm waters contributes to the difficulty of finding specimens.

== Reproduction ==
Umbellula pomona is a hermaphroditic species of Umbellula.
