= Umbellula lindahli =

- An in situ photograph of an Umbellula lindahli individual

Scientific classification
- Kingdom: Animalia
- Phylum: Cnidaria
- Subphylum: Anthozoa
- Class: Octocorallia
- Order: Scleralcyonacea
- Family: Umbellulidae
- Genus: Umbellula
- Species: U. lindahli

Binomial name
- Umbellula lindahli Kölliker, A., 1875

Species of sea pen

Umbellula lindahli is a cosmopolitan species of deep-water sea pen, first discovered in 1875 with a known depth range of 250 to 6,100 meters. This species is part of Umbellula, a genus of marine cnidarians. As of 1981, this species has been synonymized with Umbellula huxleyi.

== Description ==
Umbellula lindahli has a similar structure to other deep-water sea pens, but produces an unusually high amount of mucus. Umbellula lindahli are passive suspension feeders, and were observed spreading out individual tentacles to maximize the surface area available to filter small organisms from the water. One individual was observed curling up its tentacles in response to a sediment cloud caused by a submersible, a possible protective behavioral response.

== Distribution ==
Umbellula lindahli have been recorded worldwide, in all major oceans and are even common in the Antarctic. One study examined their distribution in detail in the Porcupine Seabright, in which they were the most common species observed, and were found at depths between 650 and 3850 meters

== Reproduction ==
Umbellula lindahli was believed to be a gonochoric species, until a recent study provided evidence for this species exhibiting tridioecy, along with another species of Umbellula. This is the first time this behavior has been observed in Umbellula, and is generally rare in invertebrates. The maximum diameter of their oocytes observed so far has been approximately 800 micrometers.
