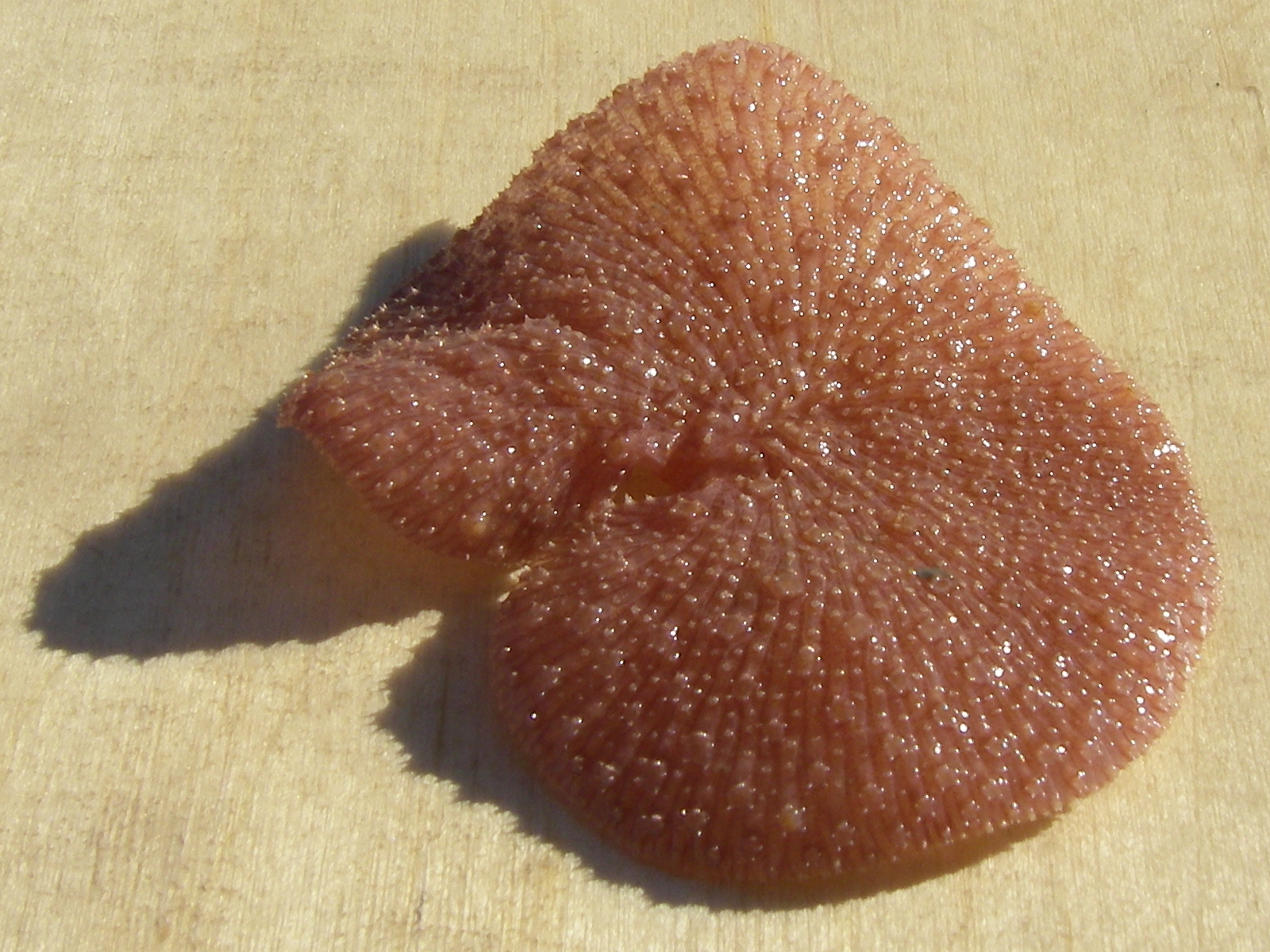
- Renilla reniformis

Scientific classification
- Kingdom: Animalia
- Phylum: Cnidaria
- Subphylum: Anthozoa
- Class: Octocorallia
- Order: Scleralcyonacea
- Family: Renillidae; Gray, 1870
- Genus: Renilla; Lamarck, 1816

= Renilla =

Genus of corals

Renilla is a genus of sea pen. It is the only genus within the monotypic family Renillidae. Sea pansy is a common name for species in this genus.

== Species ==
The following species are recognized:

- Renilla amethystina Verrill, 1864
- Renilla koellikeri Pfeffer, 1886
- Renilla muelleri Kölliker, 1872
- Renilla musaica Zamponi & Pérez, 1996
- Renilla octodentata Zamponi & Pérez, 1996
- Renilla reniformis (Pallas, 1766)
- Renilla tentaculata Zamponi, Perez & Capitali, 1996

== Anatomy and morphology ==
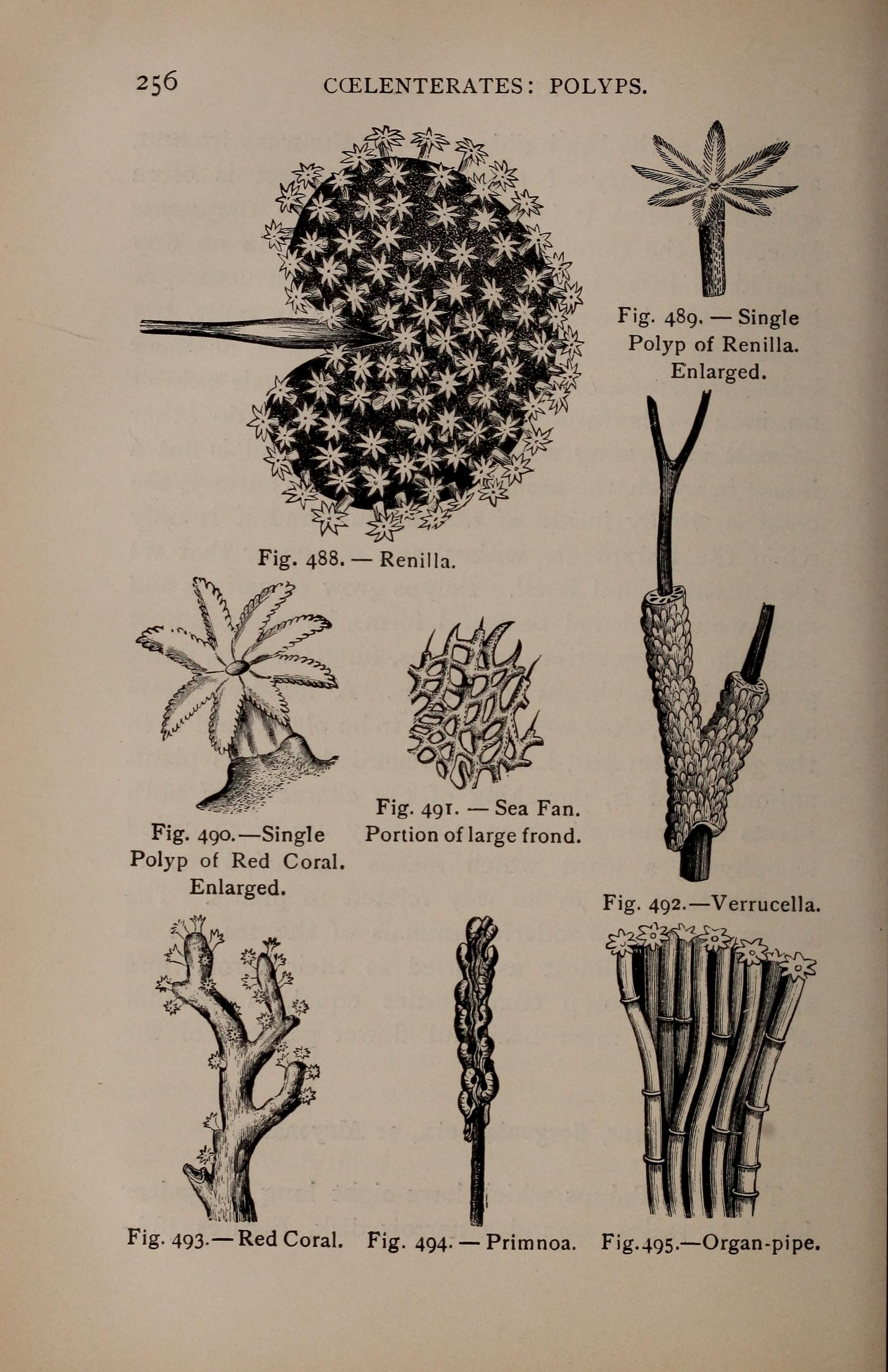
Diagram of different polyps of Celenterates.

Renilla has a distinctive heart shaped colony with a violet or red color. Pennatulaceans, in the order Pennatulacea, are soft corals in the subclass Octocorallia. But Pennatulaceans have different structures and functions from other octocorals. They form one main polyp, oozooid, which anchors itself onto the seabed using a stalk, peduncle, instead of forming a large colony like most soft corals. The top of this oozooid grows into a rachis which is the central structure. From the rachis the Pennatulaceans can grow smaller polyps which have 2 functions; the autozooids which do the feeding, and the siphonozooids which are smaller and aid in movement. The Renilla genus and some other pennatulaceans have structures called polyp leaves. These polyp leaves, which hold many autozooids, are extensions that give Renilla a feather-like appearance. Which is where their common name of Pennatulacea "sea pen" comes from, as these polyp leaves resemble the writing quills. They consist of bilateral symmetry and a soft outer body, the coelenchyme, with three tissue layers: an outer layer called the epidermis, an inner layer called the gastrodermis, and a middle layer called the mesoglea, a jelly-like layer. Inside of a mesoglea, a wide variety of skeletal elements called sclerites are formed.

== Distribution and habitat ==
Sea pansies are geographically worldwide, from the polar seas to the equatorial tropics. And they extend across depths from the shallow shores of intertidal flats to the deep ocean trenches of 6100 meters. Most Renilla often anchor to soft sediment like sand or mud, but some can even anchor to rocky surfaces. Benthic marine environments are where the sea pansies thrive. Some examples include: continental shelves and slopes, shallow coastal areas, coral reefs, deep-sea plains, and hadal zones which are deep ocean trenches. They can live in all of these environments because of the peduncle, which helps them anchor into soft sediment. You can find them in abundance in the Gulf, Atlantic ocean, and the coasts of Southern California.

== Ecology and behavior ==
Renilla are predatory filter feeders. Their diet consists of other small animals and larvae. This is accomplished by stinging their prey and capturing them in the mucus they secret on their surface. Which helps pre-digest their prey for swallowing. Once inside, the food is digested through septal filaments and intracellular digestion. Renilla are colonial, but they still exhibit some interesting behaviors; bioluminescence, contraction of their rachis, and polyp withdrawal, which are all thought to be responses of "fear" to external environmental stimuli. Their life cycle consists of a zygote which develops into planktonic larva. Metamorphosis involves the formation of tentacles, pharynx, and a septa. Then the larval settlement forms at the aboral end of the Renilla. They use sexual and asexual reproductions through the budding of secondary polyps on their surface. They are eaten by the Loggerhead Turtle, Caretta caretta. Sea pansies use their calcified sclerites to give their body structure and to defend against predators. Sclerites are formed in the mesoglea and they aid in the composition of the colonies. Research shows that they alter the colonies in response to external stimuli in the environment like predation and water motion. The smaller sclerites provide resistance and stiffness, while the larger sclerites contribute to ward off predators. In a research observation, field assays of sea pansies and their sclerites were conducted at three depths. It was concluded that the consumption of sea pansies were greatly reduced, due to the sclerites of the Renilla.

== Bioluminescence ==
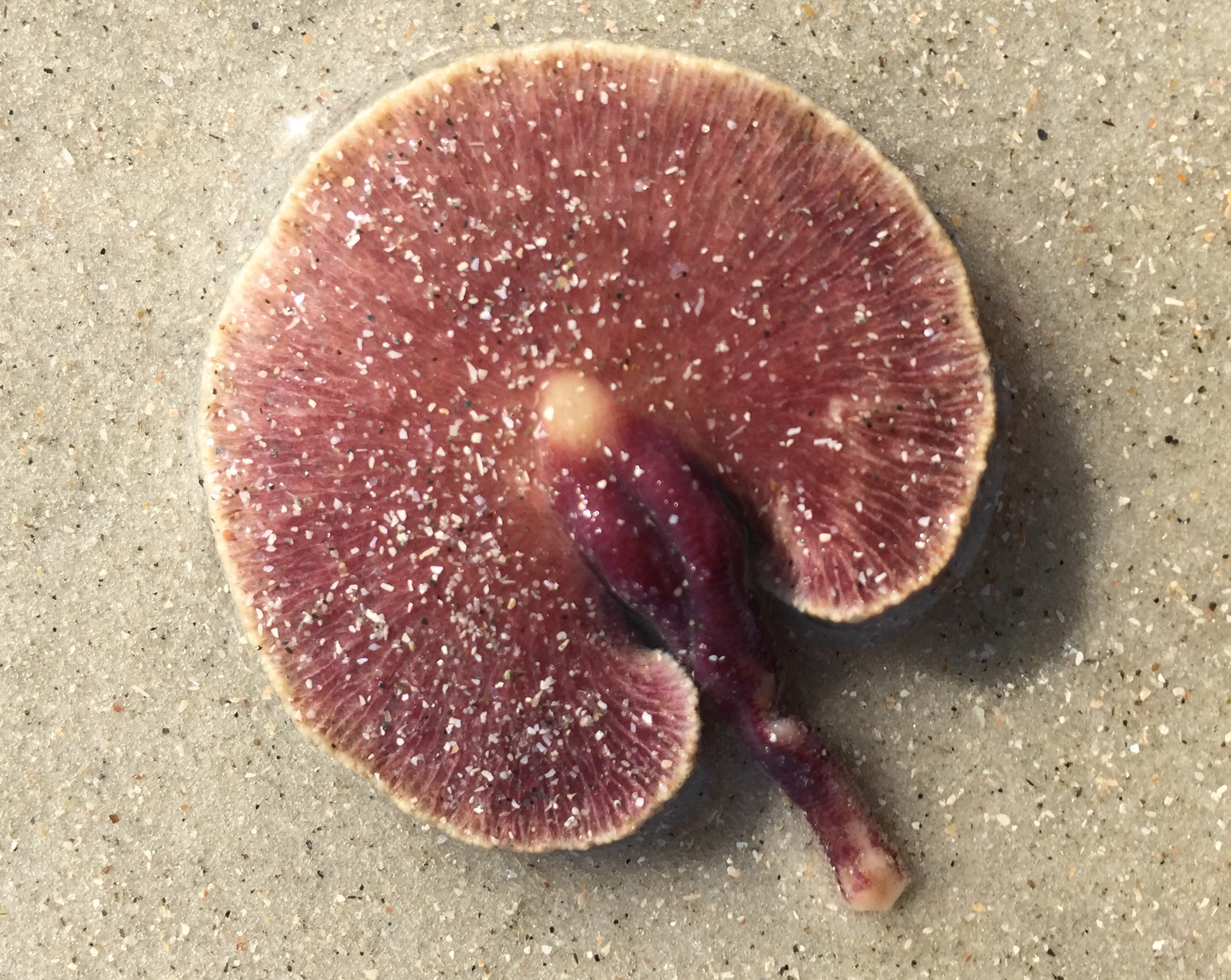
Image of Renilla reniformis, a species in the Renilla genus.

Renilla reniformis are model organisms for studying bioluminescence. They produce a protein called luciferase. This protein involves a calcium triggered reaction which breaks down a chemical called coelenterazine in the presence of oxygen to form coelenteramide, carbon dioxide, and light. Because of this, luciferase can be used as a reporter gene in experiments with cell culture and small animal imaging. As for the Renilla themselves, there are plenty of hypothesized reasons why they use bioluminescence. It could serve as a mechanism of defense, an escape response, a way to deter predators, and plenty of other reasons. But no definitive reason has been backed by substantial scientific and statistically significant evidence. Examples of some other bioluminescent animals include fireflies, some bacteria, and sharks.

== Fossil record and evolution ==
The phylogeny of sea pansies are still being studied, but there are difficulties for the scientists studying them. The genus Renilla and their order Pennatulacea does not have many distinctive physical traits for analysis. And with the traits they do possess, sea pansies are extremely delicate. Many preserved samples, as fresh specimens are hard to collect, are too damaged for DNA analysis. But there are some evolutionary histories which can be taken note of. Sea pansies have traits like bilateral symmetry and polyp leaves which are features that are modified and evolved. And there are many similarities between the Pennatulacea and Ellisellidea.

== Research ==
There was research done as a part of project MEcHa-SBSS where they studied 3 species in the genus Renilla, Renilla muelleri, Renilla musaica, and Renilla tentaculata. They were found in Southern Brazil along the continental shelf between latitudes 28°S and 34°S. These Renilla have a big influence on the ecology of that environment such as type of sediment, water temperature, and salinity. But the populations of the Renilla species are affected by their predators (turtles), competitors (sand dollars), and human interactions with their habitats. In the study, significant numbers of young Renilla colonies were observed, so they concluded that these interactions with biotic stimuli are not inhibiting reproduction and growth at an alarming rate. Research done by Charbonneau and Cormier studied LBP, a luciferin-binding protein, which has a big part in the bioluminescent process in Renilla reniformis. The LBP is compact with globular shape and a disulfide bond. When calcium binds to LBP, the protein changes shape exposing the coelenterazine, which is a luciferin, to the luciferase enzyme producing light. This reaction is hypothesized to be a response to external stimuli like touch or changes to the environment for defense and/or communication.
