= Lucibufagin =

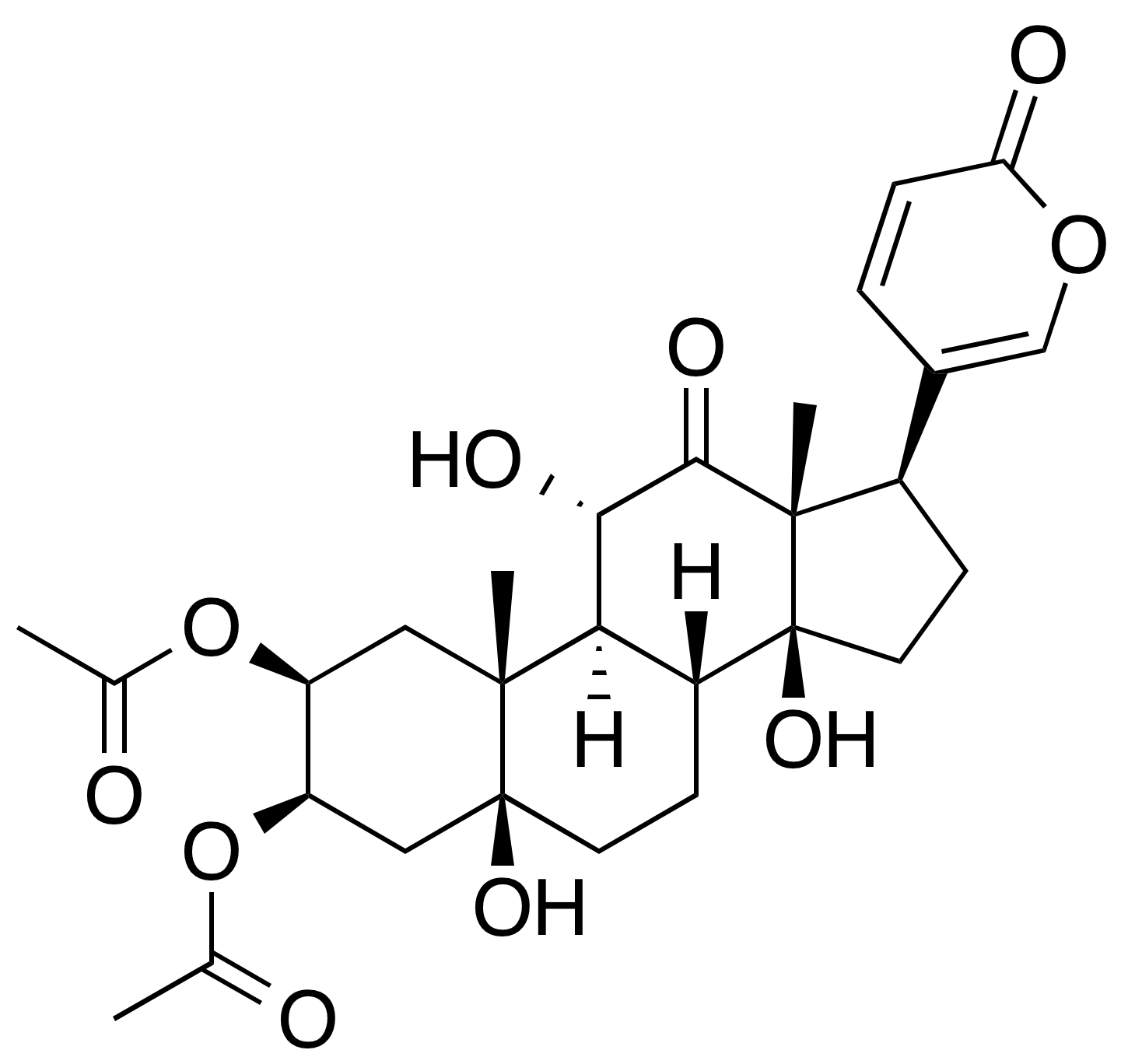
- Lucibufagin C

Identifiers
3D model (JSmol)	C: Interactive image
ChEBI	C: CHEBI:134224
ChEMBL	C: ChEMBL485697
ChemSpider	C: 24702088
PubChem CID	C: 15924888
- InChI: C: InChI=1S/C28H36O10/c1-14(29)37-19-11-25(3)22-18(7-9-27(25,34)12-20(19)38-15(2)30)28(35)10-8-17(16-5-6-21(31)36-13-16)26(28,4)24(33)23(22)32/h5-6,13,17-20,22-23,32,34-35H,7-12H2,1-4H3/t17-,18-,19+,20-,22-,23+,25-,26+,27+,28+/m1/s1 Key: DVEVNJSTCHVUOO-AXGBFFCYSA-N
- SMILES: C: C=1(C=CC(OC1)=O)[C@@H]2[C@]3(C([C@H]([C@@]4([C@]5(C[C@@H]([C@@H](C[C@]5(CC[C@]4([C@]3(CC2)O)[H])O)OC(=O)C)OC(=O)C)C)[H])O)=O)C
- Except where otherwise noted, data are given for materials in their standard state (at 25 °C [77 °F], 100 kPa). Infobox references

Lucibufagins are a group of defensive steroids produced by several species of firefly to make them unpalatable to predators such as spiders and birds. Certain species of firefly that do not themselves produce lucibufagins have been observed to eat other species of firefly that do produce the steroid to gain the defensive properties for themselves. There are three related compounds, lucibufagin A, B, and C, all in the bufadienolide structural class.
