= Bioluminescent activated destruction =

Technique used to kill cancer cells

Bioluminescent activated destruction or BLADe refers to a technique used to kill cancer cells.

It works by first altering the cells in an organism, once they become cancerous, to create the firefly light source luciferin and luciferase to create light. The light itself would have little effect on the cells if it wasn't for the addition of a photosensitizing agent which essentially makes the cells much more vulnerable to light. It can specifically eradicate the cancer cells with no negative side-effects to normal cells. Trials on humans have yet to be seen, although the trials on mice looked rather promising for it.
