= Renilla muelleri =

Scientific classification
- Domain: Eukaryota
- Kingdom: Animalia
- Phylum: Cnidaria
- Subphylum: Anthozoa
- Class: Octocorallia
- Order: Pennatulacea
- Family: Renillidae
- Genus: Renilla
- Species: R. muelleri

Binomial name
- Renilla muelleri (Kölliker, 1872)

Species of sea pansy

Renilla muelleri (also spelled R. mulleri or R. müilleri) is a species of sea pansy. It has been reported from the Gulf Coast of the United States, notably the Florida panhandle, but is also reported from the eastern coast of South America. It is thought to be a euryhaline littoral species, found to a depth of up to 150 meters.

The genome of R. muelleri was sequenced in 2019.
