= List of Photinus species =

Genus of fireflies

This is a list of 312 species in the genus Photinus.

== Photinus species ==
- Photinus abrilae Zaragoza-Caballero y González-Ramírez, 2020
- Photinus acuminatus Green, 1956
- Photinus advenus E. Olivier in Wytsman, 1907
- Photinus ahuizotli Zaragoza-Caballero and Domínguez-León, 2020
- Photinus albicauda Gorham, 1881
- Photinus albicinctus Laporte, 1840
- Photinus albilatera (Gyllenhal in Schönherr, 1817)
- Photinus albofasciatus Pic, 1941
- Photinus aldretei Zaragoza, 1996
- Photinus aliciae Zaragoza, 2005
- Photinus alticola Barber, 1941
- Photinus amazonicus (Pic, 1941)
- Photinus amenoides Zaragoza, 2000
- Photinus ampliatus E. Olivier in Wytsman, 1907
- Photinus amplus Barber, 1941
- Photinus anagabrielae Zaragoza-Caballero and Gutiérrez-Carranza, 2020
- Photinus andresi Zaragoza-Caballero and López-Pérez, 2020
- Photinus anisodrilus Zaragoza, 2007
- Photinus apicalis Pic, 1931
- Photinus aploplecticus E. Olivier, 1899
- Photinus aquilonius Lloyd, 1969
- Photinus ardens LeConte, 1852
- Photinus atomarius E. Olivier, 1888
- Photinus atroscutus Pic, 1940
- Photinus attenuatus Gorham, 1881
- Photinus augustalisi Pic, 1941
- Photinus aurantiacus Pic, 1941
- Photinus auranticollis Gorham, 1881
- Photinus australis Green, 1956 – twilight bush baby
- Photinus baeri E. Olivier in Wytsman, 1907
- Photinus bergi E. Olivier, 1888
- Photinus bicoloripes Pic, 1952
- Photinus blackwelderi Barber, 1941
- Photinus blandus Motschulsky, 1854
- Photinus bogotensis E. Olivier, 1907
- Photinus boxi Pic, 1940
- Photinus brevicornis Gorham, 1884
- Photinus brevior Pic, 1941
- Photinus brimleyi Green, 1956 – sidewinder firefly
- Photinus bruchi E. Olivier, 1909
- Photinus brunescens Barber, 1941
- Photinus brunneohumeralis Pic, 1941
- Photinus brunneotinctus Pic, 1942
- Photinus brunneovittatus Pic, 1941
- Photinus bucaro Zaragoza, 2005
- Photinus caliginosus (G. Olivier, 1790)
- Photinus calisius Pic, 1940
- Photinus carolinus Green, 1956 – Smokies synchronous firefly
- Photinus cempoalli Zaragoza-Caballero y Zurita-García, 2020
- Photinus ceratus Leng and Mutchler, 1922
- Photinus chabooae Zaragoza-Caballero y López-Pérez, 2020
- Photinus chamelensis Zaragoza, 2005
- Photinus championi Gorham, 1884
- Photinus chapingoensis Zaragoza-Caballero y Campos, 2020
- Photinus chapini Barber, 1941
- Photinus chihuahuensis Zaragoza, 1995
- Photinus cinctellus (Motschulsky, 1854)
- Photinus claricollis Pic, 1941
- Photinus clermonti Pic, 1940
- Photinus collaris Laporte, 1840
- Photinus collustrans LeConte, 1878
- Photinus commisus E. Olivier in Wytsman, 1907
- Photinus concisus Lloyd, 1968
- Photinus congruus Chevrolat, 1834
- Photinus conradti Pic, 1941
- Photinus consanguineus LeConte, 1852 – double cousin firefly
- Photinus consimilis Green, 1956 – cattail flash-train firefly
- Photinus cookii Green, 1956 – Cook's firefly
- Photinus coriocosus Pic, 1941
- Photinus coronatus Gorham, 1880
- Photinus cuasicongruus Zaragoza, 1996
- Photinus curtatus Green, 1956
- Photinus curticornis Pic, 1941
- Photinus curtipennis Pic, 1941
- Photinus dimissus LeConte, 1881
- Photinus discoidalis Pic, 1931
- Photinus discoideus (Sahlberg, 1823)
- Photinus diurnus Gorham, 1884
- Photinus dugesi Zaragoza, 1995
- Photinus ebriosus E. Olivier in Wytsman, 1907
- Photinus elisabethae Buck, 1947
- Photinus elongatus (Motschulsky, 1854)
- Photinus eous Gorham, 1884
- Photinus erichsoni Gemminger, 1870
- Photinus erici Zaragoza-Caballero and Zurita-García, 2020
- Photinus euphotus Barber, 1941
- Photinus evanescens Barber, 1941
- Photinus extensus Gorham, 1881
- Photinus fastidiosus E. Olivier in Wytsman, 1907
- Photinus flaveolus E. Olivier, 1909
- Photinus flavofemoralis Pic, 1942
- Photinus flavosuturalis Pic, 1941
- Photinus flohri Gorham, 1884
- Photinus florae Zaragoza-Caballero y Cifuentes-Ruiz, 2020
- Photinus floridanus Fall, 1927 – Florida sprite firefly
- Photinus frosti Green, 1956
- Photinus fruhstorferi Pic, 1942
- Photinus fuliginosus Pic, 1941
- Photinus fulvobasalis Pic, 1942
- Photinus furcatus Zaragoza, 2000
- Photinus fuscicornis Kirsch, 1873
- Photinus fuscus (Germar, 1824)
- Photinus garciai Pic, 1941
- Photinus gliscens Gorham, 1881
- Photinus gorhami Zaragoza, 1995
- Photinus gounellei Pic, 1941
- Photinus gracilis (Blanchard in Brullé, 1846)
- Photinus gracilobus Barber, 1941
- Photinus grandis Pic, 1931
- Photinus granulatus Fall, 1927
- Photinus greeni Lloyd, 1969
- Photinus guatemalae Gorham, 1880
- Photinus guayanensis (De Mey, 1838)
- Photinus harveyi Buck, 1947
- Photinus helgae Zaragoza-Caballero y López-Pérez, 2020
- Photinus hendrichsi Zaragoza-Caballero y Cifuentez-Ruiz, 2020
- Photinus hidalgoensis Zaragoza-Caballero y Cifuentes-Ruiz, 2020
- Photinus hoffmanni Zaragoza-Caballero y Gutiérrez-Carranza, 2020
- Photinus hondurasus Pic, 1941
- Photinus hymenodrilus Zaragoza-Caballero and Gutiérrez-Carranza, 2020
- Photinus hypoleucus Barber, 1941
- Photinus ignisfatuus Gorham, 1884
- Photinus ignitus Fall, 1927
- Photinus immaculatus Green, 1956
- Photinus impressicollis (Motschulsky, 1854)
- Photinus impressithorax Pic, 1940
- Photinus incongruus Gorham, 1884
- Photinus indictus (LeConte, 1881) – silent firefly
- Photinus ineptus E. Olivier, 1900
- Photinus infuscatus Laporte, 1840
- Photinus inhumeralis Pic, 1940
- Photinus innocuus (Boheman, 1858)
- Photinus intermedius Zaragoza, 1995
- Photinus interruptus (Erichson, 1847)
- Photinus joergenseni E. Olivier, 1910
- Photinus juarezae Zaragoza, 1996
- Photinus kleriocaro Zaragoza, 2005
- Photinus knulli Green, 1956
- Photinus kuaukali Zaragoza-Caballero y Vega-Badillo, 2020
- Photinus laticollis Pic, 1941
- Photinus latreillei E. Olivier, 1909
- Photinus lavali Pic, 1940
- Photinus lekoallois Zaragoza, 1996
- Photinus leucopyge Barber, 1941
- Photinus lewisi Buck, 1947
- Photinus limbativentris Pic, 1940
- Photinus lineellus LeConte, 1852
- Photinus littoralis (Motschulsky, 1854)
- Photinus lobatus Barber, 1941
- Photinus lojaensis Pic, 1941
- Photinus longicornis E. Olivier in Wytsman, 1907
- Photinus longus Gemminger, 1870
- Photinus lucernula Barber, 1941
- Photinus lucidotoides McDermott, 1963
- Photinus lucidus (Linnaeus, 1767)
- Photinus lucilae Zaragoza-Caballero, 2020
- Photinus luctuosus Laporte, 1840
- Photinus lundi Barber, 1941
- Photinus lunulatus (Blanchard in Brullé, 1846)
- Photinus lynnfaustae Zaragoza-Caballero y Rodríguez-Mirón, 2020
- Photinus macdermotti Lloyd, 1966 – Father Mac's firefly, "Mr. Mac"
- Photinus maculicollis Kirsch, 1873
- Photinus maculiventris Zaragoza-Caballero y Rodríguez-Mirón, 2020
- Photinus malinalli Zaragoza-Caballero and González-Ramírez, 2020
- Photinus malinalxochiltlae Zaragoza-Caballero y González-Ramírez, 2020
- Photinus manni Leng and Mutchler, 1922
- Photinus marcapatanus Pic, 1941
- Photinus marcelae Zaragoza-Caballero y Domínguez-León, 2020
- Photinus marginatus (Linnaeus, 1767)
- Photinus marginellus LeConte, 1852
- Photinus marginipennis Lucas, 1859
- Photinus maritimus E. Olivier, 1899
- Photinus marquezi Zaragoza-Caballero, 2020
- Photinus mayorgae Zaragoza-Caballero and Cifuentes-Ruiz, 2020
- Photinus mcdermotti Zaragoza, 1995
- Photinus melanurus Barber, 1941
- Photinus meridanus Pic, 1940
- Photinus meteoralis (Gorham, 1881)
- Photinus minasensis Pic, 1940
- Photinus minimus Pic, 1941
- Photinus minor Pic, 1940
- Photinus minusculus Gorham, 1884
- Photinus minutissimus Pic, 1940
- Photinus modestus Pic, 1940
- Photinus molangoensis Zaragoza-Caballero y Domínguez-León, 2020
- Photinus montanus Gorham, 1884
- Photinus moralesae Zaragoza, 2000
- Photinus morbosus Barber, 1941
- Photinus morelosensis Zaragoza, 2000
- Photinus morronei Zaragoza-Caballero, 2020
- Photinus multilineatus Pic, 1931
- Photinus naevus Barber, 1941
- Photinus niger (Blanchard in Brullé, 1846)
- Photinus nigridorsis Gorham, 1881
- Photinus nigrolimbatus Gorham, 1884
- Photinus nigrovittatus Pic, 1940
- Photinus nodieri Pic, 1940
- Photinus noguerai Zaragoza, 1996
- Photinus nothoides Buck, 1947
- Photinus nothus Barber, 1941
- Photinus obscurellus LeConte, 1851
- Photinus obscurivittatus Pic, 1941
- Photinus occidentalis (G. Olivier, 1790)
- Photinus ojiviformis Zaragoza-Caballero y Rodríguez-Mirón, 2020
- Photinus otuzcosus Pic, 1942
- Photinus ovatus Gorham, 1881
- Photinus pallens (Fabricius, 1798) – Jamaican firefly
- Photinus pallidipes Pic, 1941
- Photinus paracongruus Zaragoza, 1996
- Photinus parallelus (Blanchard in Brullé, 1846)
- Photinus pararuficollis Zaragoza, 2000
- Photinus pardalis Buck, 1947
- Photinus parvulus Gorham, 1881
- Photinus parvus (Blanchard in Brullé, 1846)
- Photinus parvusater Zaragoza, 1995
- Photinus paulomarginatus Pic, 1940
- Photinus pauperculus Boheman, 1858
- Photinus pelotasensis Pic, 1941
- Photinus peractus E. Olivier in Wytsman, 1907
- Photinus perbrevis E. Olivier, 1909
- Photinus perezi Zaragoza, 1995
- Photinus perlucens Gorham, 1880
- Photinus perotensis Zaragoza, 1996
- Photinus petaini Pic, 1940
- Photinus phalloentis Zaragoza, 1996
- Photinus phosphoreus (Linnaeus, 1767)
- Photinus piceicornis Pic, 1940
- Photinus picticollis Gorham, 1881
- Photinus platyphallos Zaragoza, 1995
- Photinus plumbeus Gorham, 1880
- Photinus pulchellus Gorham, 1880
- Photinus punctulatus LeConte, 1852
- Photinus pusillus Gorham, 1884
- Photinus pyralis (Linnaeus, 1767) – common eastern firefly, big dipper firefly
- Photinus quadratifer (Blanchard in Brullé, 1846)
- Photinus radians Gorham, 1884
- Photinus reductilimbatus Pic, 1942
- Photinus reductimarginalis Pic, 1941
- Photinus reductus Pic, 1940
- Photinus reichei Gorham, 1881
- Photinus reveritus E. Olivier in Wytsman, 1907
- Photinus risorius E. Olivier, 1909
- Photinus roseicollis (Blanchard in Brullé, 1846)
- Photinus ruficollis Gorham, 1880
- Photinus rufomarginatus (Blanchard in Brullé, 1846)
- Photinus sabulosus Green, 1956
- Photinus saladosus Pic, 1941
- Photinus sanctaeluciae McDermott, 1958
- Photinus sanctus E. Olivier, 1909
- Photinus saniphallos Zaragoza, 2000
- Photinus santiagonus Pic, 1940
- Photinus scintillans (Say, 1825)
- Photinus secernatus E. Olivier in Wytsman, 1907
- Photinus semibasalis Pic, 1941
- Photinus semilimbatus Pic, 1942
- Photinus semiluteus Pic, 1939
- Photinus sericellus E. Olivier, 1886
- Photinus signaticollis (Blanchard in Brullé, 1846)
- Photinus signaticornis Gorham, 1884
- Photinus simplex Gorham, 1881
- Photinus simulans E. Olivier, 1910
- Photinus speciosus E. Olivier, 1910
- Photinus stellaris Fall, 1927
- Photinus suavis E. Olivier in Wytsman, 1907
- Photinus subauranticus Pic, 1931
- Photinus subfuscus Gorham, 1884
- Photinus subinterruptus Pic, 1941
- Photinus sublatus Pic, 1941
- Photinus subquadricollis Pic, 1941
- Photinus subtestaceus Pic, 1930
- Photinus succensus E. Olivier in Wytsman, 1907
- Photinus sulcicollis E. Olivier, 1886
- Photinus suturellus (Motschulsky, 1854)
- Photinus synchronans Barber, 1941
- Photinus taeniatus E. Olivier, 1908
- Photinus tanytoxus Lloyd, 1966
- Photinus tapianus Pic, 1940
- Photinus teffensis Pic, 1930
- Photinus temazcalli Zaragoza-Caballero y González-Ramírez, 2020
- Photinus tenuicinctus Green, 1956 – thinly-girdled firefly, "Ozark spark"
- Photinus tenuilineatus Zaragoza, 1996
- Photinus tepetzala Zaragoza-Caballero y Vega-Badillo, 2020
- Photinus tepeyollotli Zaragoza-Caballero y Vega-Badillo, 2020
- Photinus texanus Green, 1956
- Photinus tezozomoci Zaragoza-Caballero y López-Pérez, 2020
- Photinus tlapacoyanensis Zaragoza, 1996
- Photinus toledoi Zaragoza, 2000
- Photinus tricolorithorax Pic, 1940
- Photinus truncatus (Eschscholtz, 1822)
- Photinus tucumanus Pic, 1940
- Photinus tuxtlaensis Zaragoza, 1995
- Photinus umbratus LeConte, 1878
- Photinus variabilis Barber, 1941
- Photinus vegai Zaragoza-Caballero y Cifuentes-Ruiz, 2020
- Photinus velutinus (Motschulsky, 1854)
- Photinus venustulus Erichson, 1847
- Photinus vianai Pic, 1939
- Photinus viduus Erichson, 1847
- Photinus vitiosus Gemminger, 1870
- Photinus vittaticollis Pic, 1940
- Photinus vulgatus E. Olivier in Wytsman, 1907
- Photinus westcotti Zaragoza-Caballero, 2020
- Photinus weygandi Pic, 1940
- Photinus xanthophotis (Goose, 1848)
- Photinus xipei Zaragoza-Caballero y Vega-Badillo, 2020
- Photinus xonamancae Zaragoza, 1996
- Photinus zacualtipanensis Zaragoza-Caballero y Domínguez-León, 2020
- Photinus zempoalensis Zaragoza-Caballero y Zurita-García, 2020
- Photinus zongolicaensis Zaragoza-Caballero y Domínguez-León, 2020
