= Brimley =

Brimley may refer to:

== People ==
- Clement Samuel Brimley (1863–1946), American zoologist
- George Brimley (1819–1857), English essayist
- Herbert Hutchinson Brimley (1861–1946), American zoologist
- Wilford Brimley (1934–2020), American actor

== Places ==
- Brimley, Bovey Tracey, a hamlet in Bovey Tracey parish, Devon, England
  - Brimley Halt railway station, former railway station
- Brimley, Hawkchurch, a hamlet in Hawkchurch parish, Devon, England
- Brimley, Michigan

== See also ==
- Brimley’s Algibelle, a species of moth
- Brimley's chorus frog, named for Clement S Brimley
- Brimley Road, a north–south street in Toronto, Ontario, Canada
- Brimley State Park, Michigan
