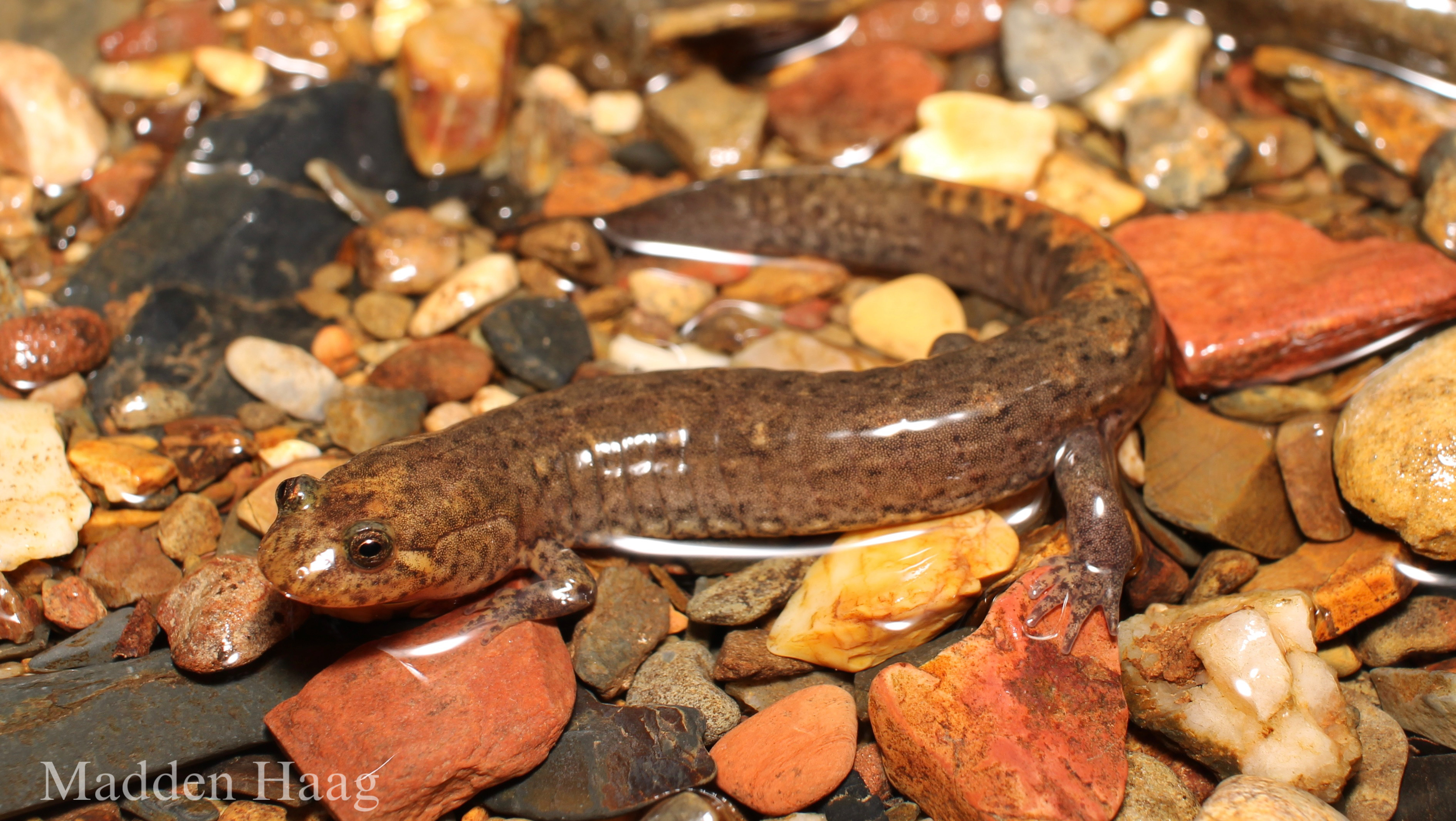

Conservation status
- Least Concern (IUCN 3.1)

Scientific classification
- Kingdom: Animalia
- Phylum: Chordata
- Class: Amphibia
- Order: Urodela
- Family: Plethodontidae
- Genus: Desmognathus
- Species: D. brimleyorum

Binomial name
- Desmognathus brimleyorum Stejneger, 1896

= Ouachita dusky salamander =

Species of amphibian

The Ouachita dusky salamander (Desmognathus brimleyorum) is a species of salamander in the family Plethodontidae. It is endemic to the states of Arkansas and Oklahoma in the United States. The specific epithet is in honor of Herbert Hutchinson Brimley and his younger brother, Clement Samuel Brimley, both of whom were zoologists.

== Description ==
The Ouachita dusky salamander grows to about 17.8 centimetres (7.0 in) in length including a finned tail. The upper side is greenish-brown or grey of a fairly uniform colour and the juveniles have a row of pale spots along each side. There are fourteen costal rib grooves on either side.

== Distribution and habitat ==
The Ouachita dusky salamander occurs in mountainous areas of Arkansas and Oklahoma. Its range includes the Ouachita Mountains, Petit Jean Mountain, Rich Mountain, the Winding Stair Mountain National Recreation Area, the Black Fork Mountain Wilderness, the Kiamichi Mountains and the Potato Hills north of Tuskahoma. They live in and near mountain streams and the ravines and woodland close by, on scree slopes, in gravelly areas, on islands and near springs.

== Biology ==
Breeding takes place mainly between July and September. The female deposits twenty to thirty eggs in a grape-like cluster under rocks or in mud chambers usually on land. She broods them until they hatch and then the larvae make their way to water. At first they conceal themselves in the gaps between stones and debris on the streambed. They are carnivorous and overwinter as larvae, undergoing metamorphosis the following summer.

== Status ==
In the IUCN Red List of Threatened Species, Desmognathus brimleyorum is listed as being of "Least concern". There may be a slow decline in numbers but these have not been quantified and there are thought to be more than 10,000 individuals across its range. The greatest threat is the silting up of the streams where it breeds due to logging activities, but when the streams recover, the salamanders move back into the area.
