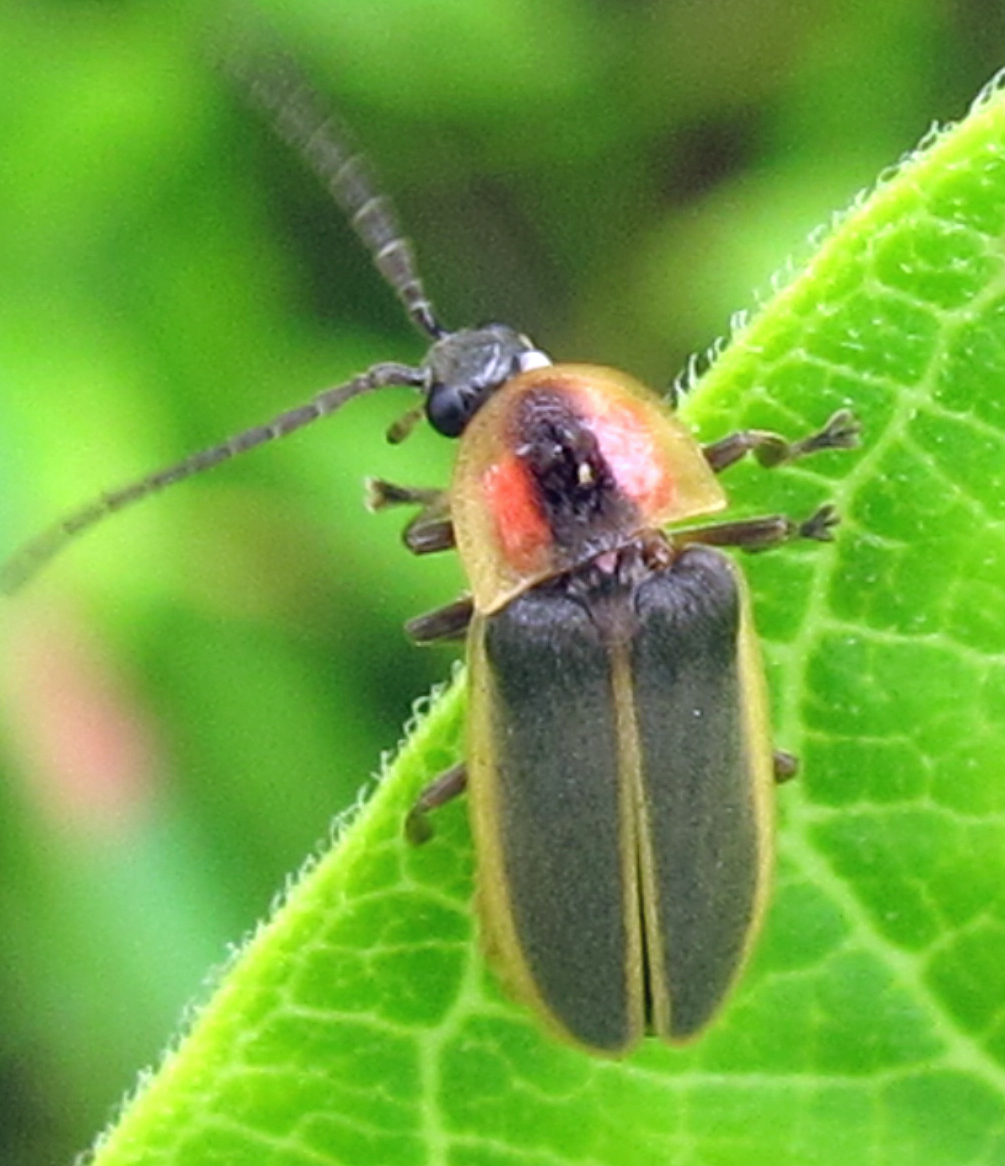

Conservation status
- Data Deficient (IUCN 3.1)

Scientific classification
- Kingdom: Animalia
- Phylum: Arthropoda
- Clade: Pancrustacea
- Class: Insecta
- Order: Coleoptera
- Suborder: Polyphaga
- Infraorder: Elateriformia
- Family: Lampyridae
- Genus: Photinus
- Species: P. consimilis

Binomial name
- Photinus consimilis Green, 1956

= Photinus consimilis =

Species of beetle

Photinus consimilis, or cattail flash-train firefly, is a species of firefly in the beetle family Lampyridae. It is found in eastern North America.

== Description ==
P. consimilis is a medium-sized beetle, with adults that measure about 10—11 mm (0.4 in) long. The head shield, or pronotum, is pale yellow with a dark, central bar that is sometimes wider at the front, bounded by red or pink. The wing covers, or elytra, are dark with light-colored margins. The male has lanterns on 2 segments of its abdomen and the female has a lantern on only one segment. The rest of the abdominal segments are dark.

== Etymology ==
The specific epithet, consimilis, means "with similarity", and refers to the fact that there are several other closely related species that look similar, including Photinus carolinus.

== Life Cycle ==
Beetles such as P. consimilis go through four life stages: egg, larva, pupa, and adult. Photinus fireflies spend the majority of their lives as larvae, which are bioluminescent and likely live below the soil surface, eating snails, worms, and other soft-bodied invertebrates.

== Behavior ==
Adult male P. consimilis fireflies fly usually about eye level or lower, flashing a series of quick pulses to attract the attention of females. Their flash pattern consists of 3 to 9 quick pulses of light, with each series, or flash train, about 2 seconds in length, with a period of 9 to 12 seconds of darkness before the next flash train, depending on temperature. A female responds with an answering double flash from a perch on low vegetation, and the communication continues until the male and female locate each other in order to mate.

== Habitat ==
This firefly is found in wetlands, along streams, on riverbanks, and in marshes.

== Range ==
P. consimilis is native to the eastern United States and has been found as far west as eastern Oklahoma and north to southern Ontario.
