= E. Newton Harvey =

American zoologist (1887–1959)

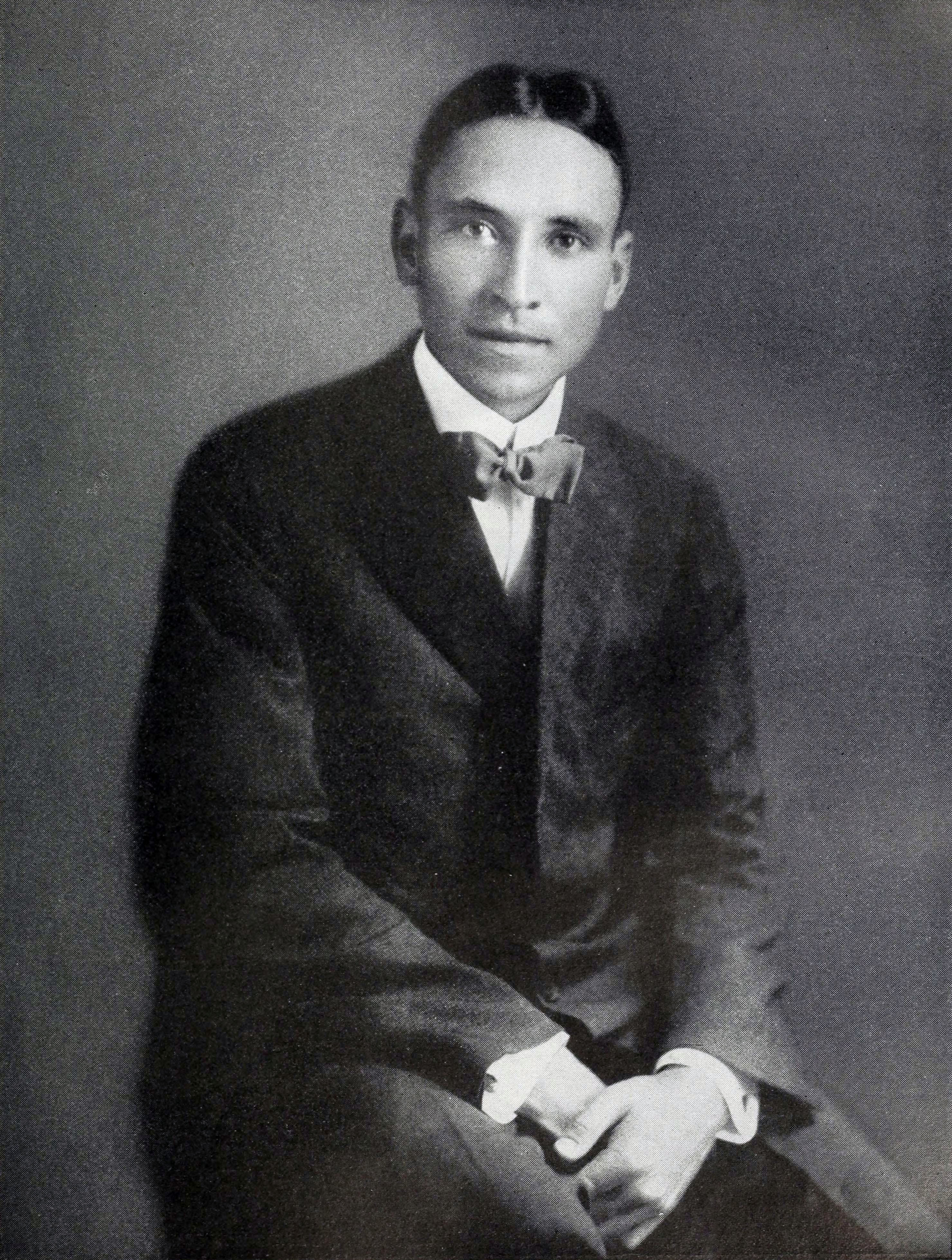
- Born: Edmund Newton Harvey; November 25, 1887; Germantown, Pennsylvania
- Died: July 21, 1959 (aged 71); Woods Hole, Massachusetts
- Education: University of Pennsylvania; Columbia University
- Known for: Bioluminescence
- Scientific career
- Fields: Zoology
- Thesis: Studies on the Permeability of Cells (1911)
- Doctoral advisor: Thomas Hunt Morgan
- Doctoral students: William D. McElroy

Edmund Newton Harvey (November 25, 1887 – July 21, 1959) was an American zoologist. He was acknowledged as one of the leading authorities on bioluminescence. He won the Rumford Prize in 1947 and was a member of the National Academy of Sciences, the American Philosophical Society, and the American Academy of Arts and Sciences in 1929.

== Early life ==
Harvey was born on November 25, 1887, in Germantown, Pennsylvania. He was the only son and fourth child of a minister in Philadelphia who died when Harvey was six years old. His interest in natural history was exhibited at an early age and he liked collecting things and spending as much time as possible in the countryside. He was educated at Germantown Academy followed by the University of Pennsylvania where his interest in science excluded most of the social activities enjoyed by his contemporaries. He then moved to New York where he started his doctoral research under the evolutionary biologist Thomas Hunt Morgan at Columbia University.

== Career ==
In 1913 Harvey went on an expedition to the South Pacific with Alfred G. Mayer, a retired professor from the University of Pennsylvania. It was probably on this trip that he became interested in bioluminescence, and later that year he wrote a paper "On the chemical nature of the luminous material of the firefly". In 1916 he married a marine biologist, Ethel Nicholson Browne, and during their honeymoon in Japan he became fascinated by the bioluminescent ostracod Vargula hilgendorfii. This could be dried and would emit blue light when remoistened. He had large quantities of it shipped back to the United States where he devoted the next thirty years to studying the phenomenon of bioluminescence, and the chemical reactions involved in the process, in the ostracod and various other bioluminescent organisms. He discovered that the light-emitting substances known as luciferins were acted on by enzymes called luciferases and that both were species specific and not interchangeable.

After completion of his thesis, Harvey moved to work under Edwin Conklin at Princeton University. By 1919 he was professor there and became the Henry Fairfield Osborn Professor on Conklin's retirement in 1933. He introduced courses in biochemistry and physiology, subjects little studied then, and inspired his students with his enthusiasm for everything scientific. During his career he wrote four books and had about 250 papers published, mostly on the subject of bioluminescence. Other fields of research included cell permeability and the effects of supersonic waves on living organisms. During World War II he studied decompression sickness and wound ballistics. He collaborated with Alfred Lee Loomis in the invention of the centrifuge microscope and he was a pioneer in the field of electroencephalography.

== Personal life ==
Harvey's wife, Ethel Browne Harvey, worked on sea urchins in the same laboratories as Harvey in Princeton and Woods Hole. They had two sons, Edmund (born 1916) and Richard (born 1922), who received doctorates in chemistry and medicine respectively. Harvey died of heart failure at Woods Hole on July 21, 1959, at age 71. He is commemorated in the names of a species of bioluminescent bacterium (Vibrio harveyi), a luminous crustacean (Enewton harveyi), a species of firefly (Photinus harveyi) and a species of centipede (Pselloides harveyi).
