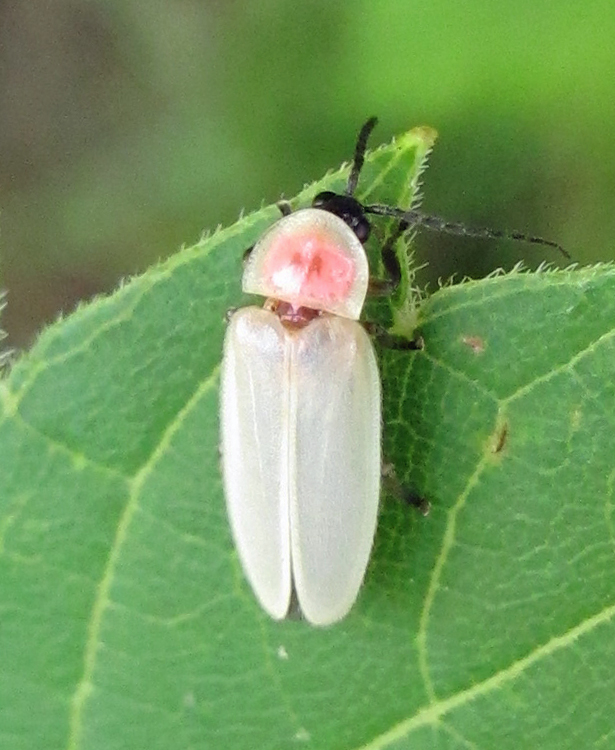

Scientific classification
- Kingdom: Animalia
- Phylum: Arthropoda
- Class: Insecta
- Order: Coleoptera
- Suborder: Polyphaga
- Infraorder: Elateriformia
- Family: Lampyridae
- Genus: Photinus
- Species: P. marginellus

Binomial name
- Photinus marginellus LeConte, 1852

= Photinus marginellus =

Species of beetle

Photinus marginellus is a species of firefly in the beetle family Lampyridae. It is found in North America.
