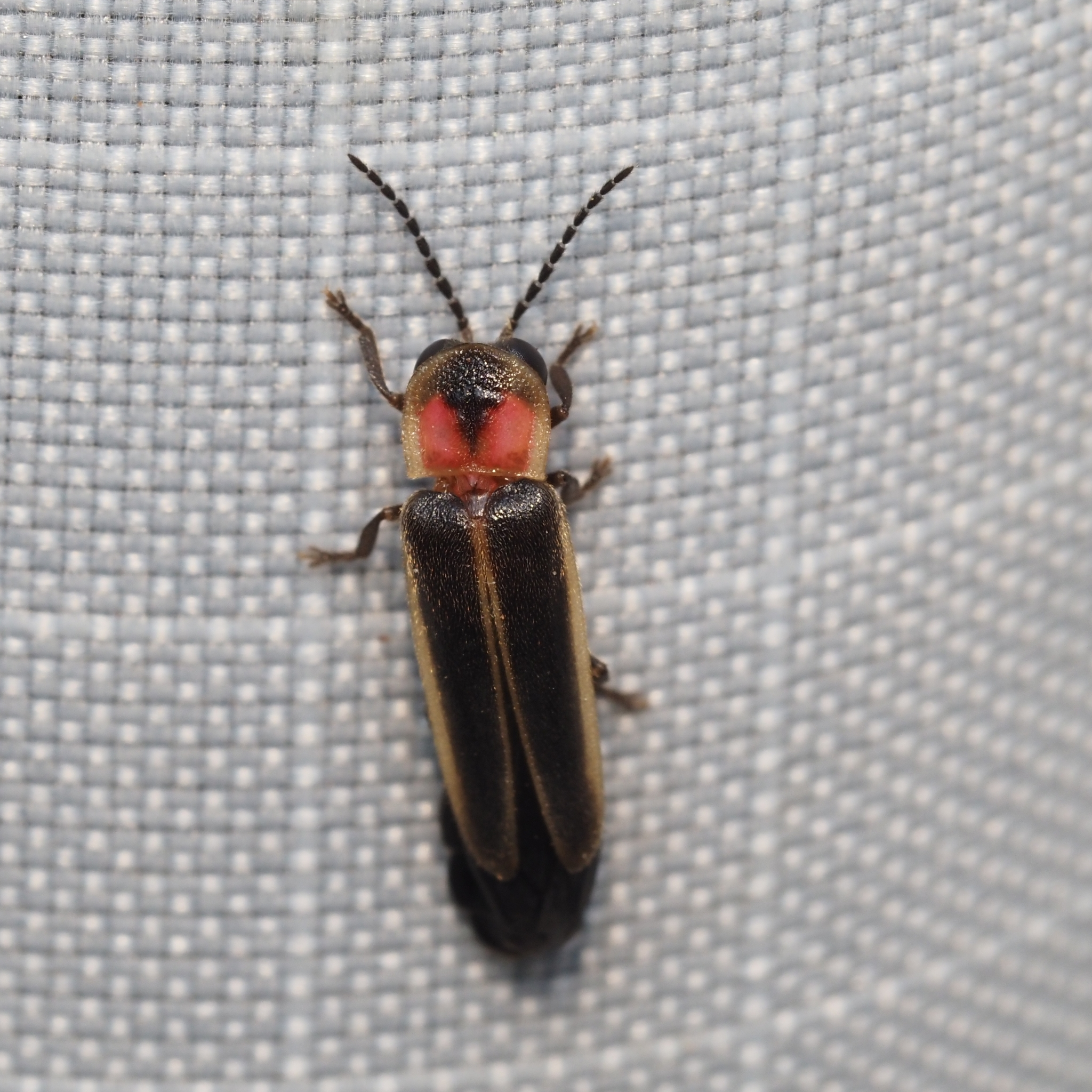

Scientific classification
- Kingdom: Animalia
- Phylum: Arthropoda
- Class: Insecta
- Order: Coleoptera
- Suborder: Polyphaga
- Infraorder: Elateriformia
- Family: Lampyridae
- Genus: Photinus
- Species: P. dimissus

Binomial name
- Photinus dimissus LeConte, 1881

= Photinus dimissus =

Species of beetle

Photinus dimissus is a species of firefly in the family Lampyridae. It is found in North America.
