= Photinus ardens =

Conservation status
- Data Deficient (IUCN 3.1)

Scientific classification
- Kingdom: Animalia
- Phylum: Arthropoda
- Class: Insecta
- Order: Coleoptera
- Suborder: Polyphaga
- Infraorder: Elateriformia
- Family: Lampyridae
- Genus: Photinus
- Species: P. ardens

Binomial name
- Photinus ardens LeConte, 1852

Species of beetle

Photinus ardens is a species of firefly in the beetle family Lampyridae. It is found in North America.
