= Photinus macdermotti =

Conservation status
- Least Concern (IUCN 3.1)

Scientific classification
- Kingdom: Animalia
- Phylum: Arthropoda
- Clade: Pancrustacea
- Class: Insecta
- Order: Coleoptera
- Suborder: Polyphaga
- Infraorder: Elateriformia
- Family: Lampyridae
- Genus: Photinus
- Species: P. macdermotti

Binomial name
- Photinus macdermotti Lloyd, 1966

Species of beetle

Photinus macdermotti, or Father Mac's firefly or Mr. Mac, is a species of firefly in the family Lampyridae. It is found in North America.

== Description ==
P. macdermotti is a medium-sized beetle, with adults that measure about 10 mm (0.4 in) long. The head shield, or pronotum, is pale yellow with a black, rectangular central mark bounded by red or pink. The wing covers, or elytra, are dark with well-defined, light-colored margins. The male has lanterns in segments 6 and 7 of its abdomen, and the female has only one lantern. It is nearly identical in appearance to Photinus consanguineus and Photinus greeni.

== Etymology ==
The species honors Frank McDermott, a firefly expert from the 1900s.

== Life Cycle ==
Beetles such as P. macdermotti go through four life stages: egg, larva, pupa, and adult. Photinus fireflies spend the majority of their lives as larvae, which are bioluminescent and likely live below the soil surface, eating snails, worms, and other soft-bodied invertebrates.

== Behavior ==
Adult male P. macdermotti fireflies fly 0.3–1.2 m (1–4 ft) off the ground and flash to attract the attention of females. Their flash pattern consists of two quick pulses of light, with each pulse approximately 0.25 seconds in length, with a period of 2 seconds of darkness before the next set of 2 pulses at 70 °F (21.1 °C). A female responds with an answering flash from a perch on low vegetation. The male and female communicate in this way until the male finds the female and they mate.

== Habitat ==
These fireflies can be found in both lower-elevation forests and higher-elevation river valleys and open forests.

== Range ==
P. macdermotti is found in the eastern United States from Oklahoma to the west, Florida to the south, and New England to the north. It is also found in Ontario, Canada.
