= Photinus knulli =

Scientific classification
- Domain: Eukaryota
- Kingdom: Animalia
- Phylum: Arthropoda
- Class: Insecta
- Order: Coleoptera
- Suborder: Polyphaga
- Infraorder: Elateriformia
- Family: Lampyridae
- Genus: Photinus
- Species: P. knulli

Binomial name
- Photinus knulli Green, 1956

Species of beetle

Photinus knulli is a species of firefly in the beetle family Lampyridae. It is found in North America.
