= Photinus brimleyi =

Conservation status
- Least Concern (IUCN 3.1)

Scientific classification
- Kingdom: Animalia
- Phylum: Arthropoda
- Clade: Pancrustacea
- Class: Insecta
- Order: Coleoptera
- Suborder: Polyphaga
- Infraorder: Elateriformia
- Family: Lampyridae
- Genus: Photinus
- Species: P. brimleyi

Binomial name
- Photinus brimleyi Green, 1956

Species of beetle

Dorsal view of a male Photinus brimleyi firefly from Polk County, Arkansas

Ventral view of a male Photinus brimleyi firefly

Dorsal view of a female Photinus brimleyi firefly

Side view of a female Photinus brimleyi firefly

Photinus brimleyi, or sidewinder firefly, is a species of firefly in the Photinus genus. It is found in the southeastern United States.

== Description ==
P. brimleyi is a medium-sized beetle, with adults measuring 10–14 mm (0.4–0.6 in) long. Males and females have very different appearances. The males have dark wing covers, or elytra, with wide, blurred, light-colored side margins, and a pale yellow head shield, or pronotum, with a dark central mark shaped like a mushroom or a teardrop. Flat-lobed lanterns are visible on the male's abdomen. The larviform female resembles a colorful pink and yellow grub with no wings and very small elytra.

== Etymology ==
The specific epithet is in honor of the naturalist Clement Samuel Brimley, who mentioned the species in his 1938 Insects of North Carolina, although it was not named until John Wagener Green published Revision of the Nearctic species of "Photinus" in 1956.

== Lifecycle ==
Beetles such as P. brimleyi go through four life stages: egg, larva, pupa, and adult. Photinus fireflies spend the majority of their lives as larvae, which are bioluminescent and likely live below the soil surface, eating snails, worms, and other soft-bodied invertebrates. Adults appear in mid-summer, from late June to early August.

== Behavior ==
Adult male P. brimleyi fireflies fly 0.3–2 m (1.0–6.6 ft) off the ground and flash to attract the attention of females, starting at sunset or about 15 minutes after sunset. Their flash pattern consists of a fast sideways arc that doubles back on itself. After flashing, the male flies 1–2 m (3–7 ft) forward, then flashes again, about 1.5 to 2.5 seconds later. A female responds with an answering flash from the entrance of her burrow or from a perch up to 15 cm (6 in) high on low vegetation. The male and female communicate in this way until the male finds the female and they mate.

== Habitat ==
P. brimleyi can be seen in damp, mature forests, fields, lawns, and dry upland scrub forests.

== Range ==
P. brimleyi has been recorded in the southeastern United States, including Tennessee, Kentucky, Alabama, Georgia, North Carolina, Oklahoma, and Arkansas.
