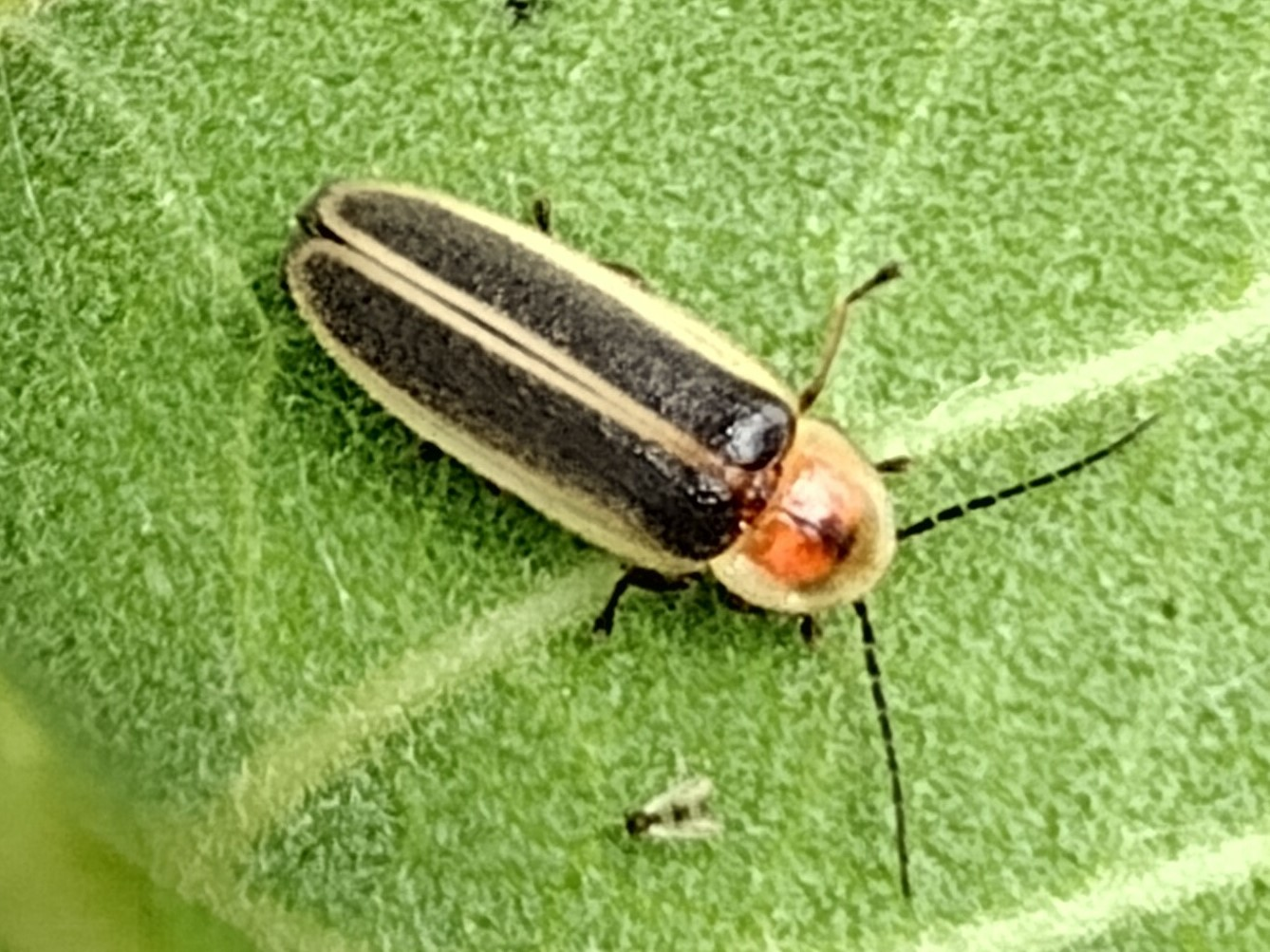

Scientific classification
- Kingdom: Animalia
- Phylum: Arthropoda
- Class: Insecta
- Order: Coleoptera
- Suborder: Polyphaga
- Infraorder: Elateriformia
- Family: Lampyridae
- Genus: Photinus
- Species: P. curtatus

Binomial name
- Photinus curtatus Green, 1956

= Photinus curtatus =

Species of beetle

Photinus curtatus is a species of firefly in the family Lampyridae. It is found in North America.
