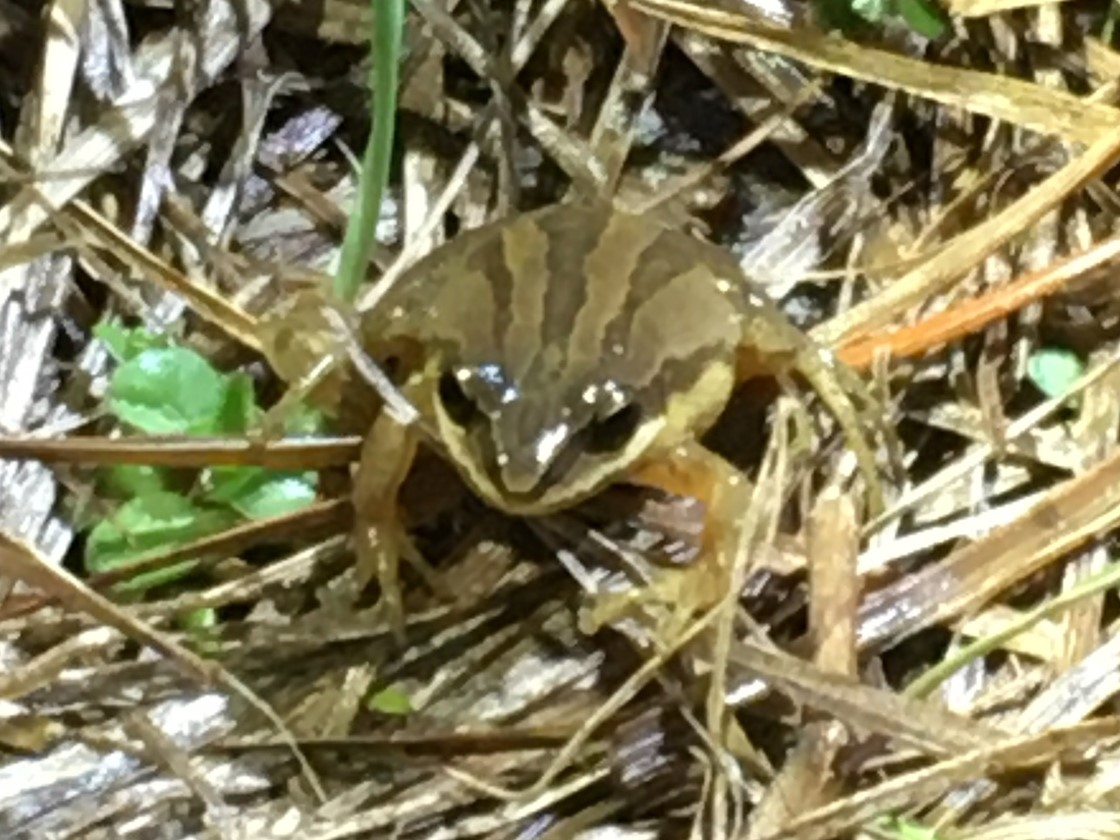

Conservation status
- Least Concern (IUCN 3.1)

Scientific classification
- Kingdom: Animalia
- Phylum: Chordata
- Class: Amphibia
- Order: Anura
- Family: Hylidae
- Genus: Pseudacris
- Species: P. brimleyi

Binomial name
- Pseudacris brimleyi Brandt & Walker, 1933

= Brimley's chorus frog =

Species of amphibian

Brimley's chorus frog (Pseudacris brimleyi) is a species of frog in the family Hylidae. It is endemic to the United States and is named for North Carolina zoologist C.S. Brimley.

== Physical characteristics ==
Brimley's chorus frog is small, with adults reaching a length of 1 in (25 mm) in males and 1.3 in (33 mm) in females. It is usually tan in color. It has a dark brown or black stripe running from snout to groin on both sides of its body. It has three parallel stripes down its back and a yellowish belly. Some may have brown spots on their chests. It has a pale stripe on its upper lip extending to its tympanum.

== Habitat ==
Brimley's chorus frog is found in the Atlantic Coastal Plain from northeastern Georgia to southern Caroline County, Virginia.

Its natural habitats are subtropical forests, rivers, intermittent rivers, swamps, freshwater marshes, intermittent freshwater marshes, ponds, open excavations, canals, and ditches. It is threatened by habitat loss.
