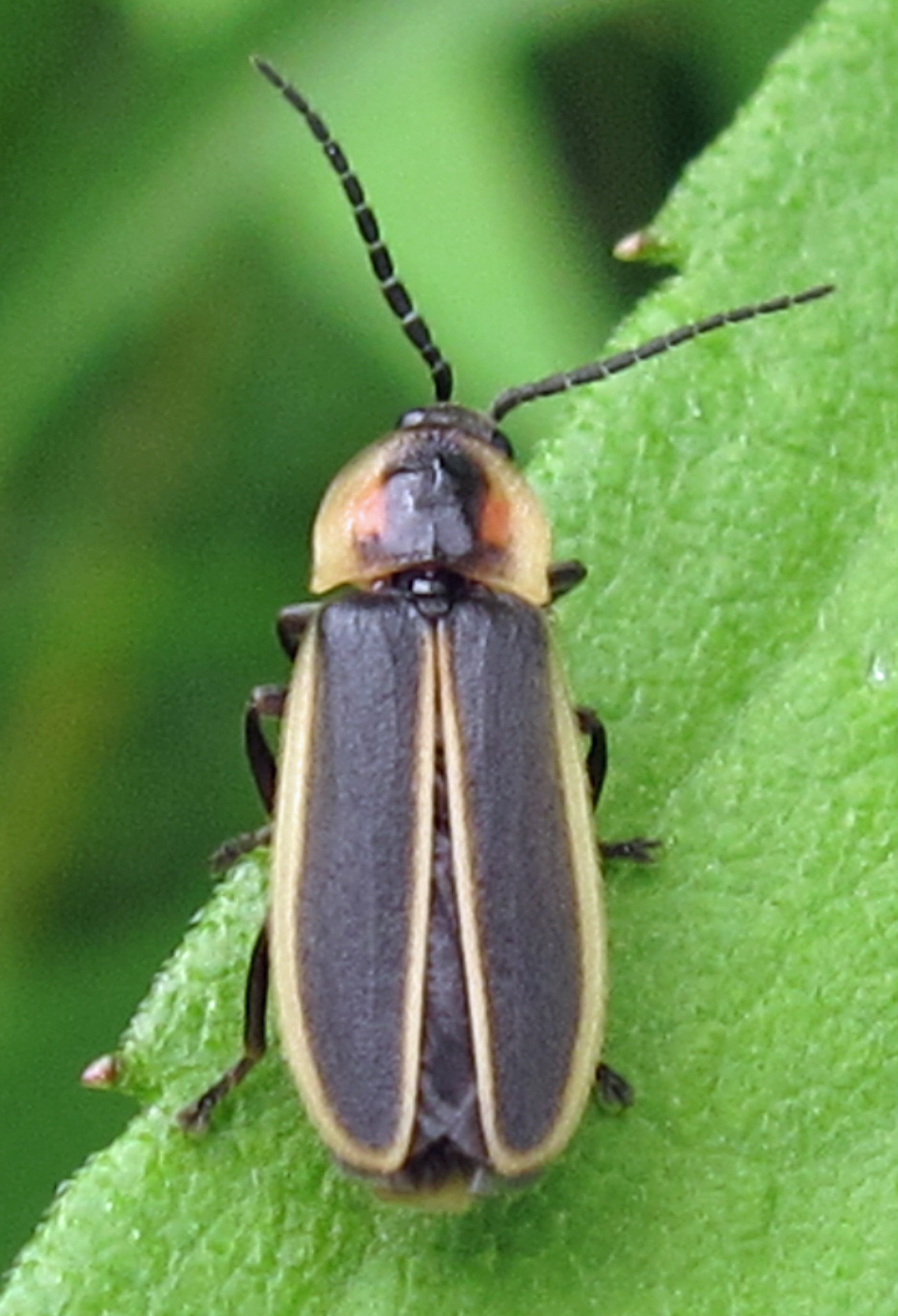
- Photinus indictus photographed in Wheatley, Ontario, Canada

Conservation status
- Least Concern (IUCN 3.1)

Scientific classification
- Kingdom: Animalia
- Phylum: Arthropoda
- Clade: Pancrustacea
- Class: Insecta
- Order: Coleoptera
- Suborder: Polyphaga
- Infraorder: Elateriformia
- Family: Lampyridae
- Genus: Photinus
- Species: P. indictus

Binomial name
- Photinus indictus (LeConte, 1881)

Synonyms
- Pyropyga indicta LeConte, 1881

= Photinus indictus =

Species of beetle

Photinus indictus, or silent firefly, is a species of firefly in the beetle family Lampyridae. It is a diurnal firefly, active during the day rather than at night, with no lanterns. It is found in eastern North America.

== Description ==
P. indictus is a small to medium-sized beetle, with adults approximately 6–10 mm (0.2–0.4 in) long. The head shield, or pronotum, is pale yellow with a thick, black, rectangular central mark with red or pink on both sides. The wing covers, or elytra, are dark with wide, well-defined, light-colored margins. Unlike fireflies that produce light as adults, P. indictus has no lanterns on its abdomen. The female is often slightly larger than the male.

== Life Cycle ==
Beetles such as P. indictus go through four life stages: egg, larva, pupa, and adult. Photinus fireflies spend the majority of their lives as larvae, which are bioluminescent and likely live below the soil surface, eating snails, worms, and other soft-bodied invertebrates.

== Behavior ==
Adult P. indictus fireflies are believed to attract mates through airborne pheromones.

== Habitat ==
They can be found in meadows, pastures, and fields.

== Range ==
P. indictus is found in eastern North America, most commonly in the Great Lakes region of the United States and Canada.
