= Photinus harveyi =

Scientific classification
- Domain: Eukaryota
- Kingdom: Animalia
- Phylum: Arthropoda
- Class: Insecta
- Order: Coleoptera
- Suborder: Polyphaga
- Infraorder: Elateriformia
- Family: Lampyridae
- Genus: Photinus
- Species: P. harveyi

Binomial name
- Photinus harveyi Buck, 1947

Species of beetle

Photinus harveyi is a species of firefly native to Jamaica. It was first described by the American biologist John B. Buck in 1947 and was named in honour of the American zoologist E. Newton Harvey, a leading authority on bioluminescence.
