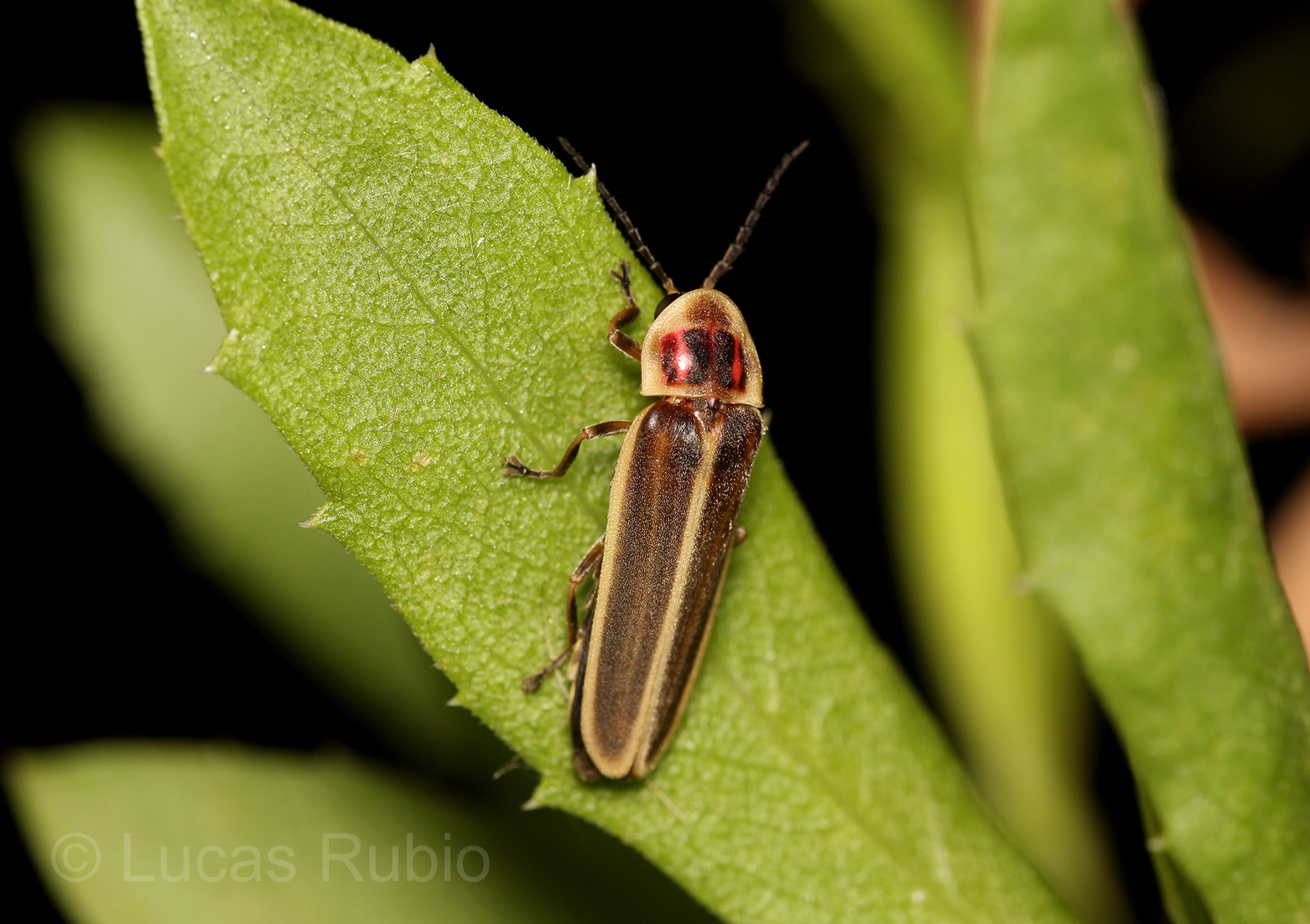

Scientific classification
- Domain: Eukaryota
- Kingdom: Animalia
- Phylum: Arthropoda
- Class: Insecta
- Order: Coleoptera
- Suborder: Polyphaga
- Infraorder: Elateriformia
- Family: Lampyridae
- Genus: Photinus
- Species: P. signaticollis

Binomial name
- Photinus signaticollis Émile Blanchard, 1846
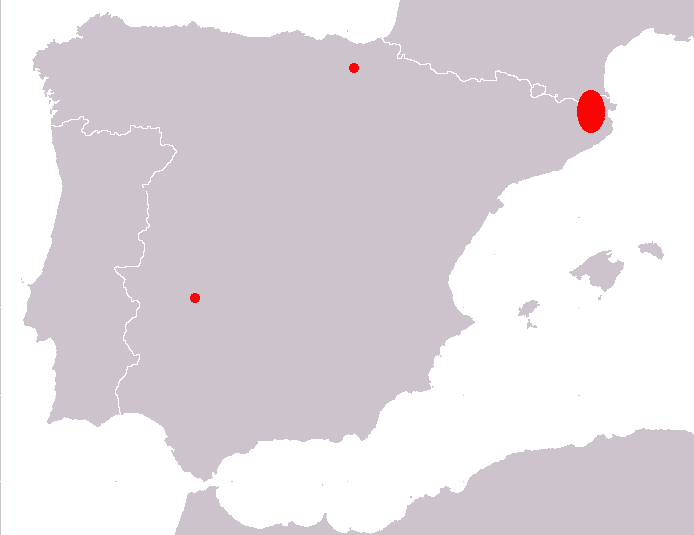
- Distribution in Europe (Iberian Peninsula), Feb 2022

Synonyms
- Photinus immigrans

= Photinus signaticollis =

Species of firefly

Photinus signaticollis is a species of firefly native to Argentina and Uruguay. In 2018 the species was observed in the northeast of the Iberian Peninsula, and initially described as a new species, Photinus immigrans. However, in 2022 it was found that the population in the Iberian Peninsula corresponded to the species Photinus signaticollis.

== Expansion in Europe ==
It is estimated that the introduction of Photinus signaticollis in the Iberian Peninsula could have occurred in 2016 in the province of Girona. The expansion of the species is very rapid, possibly due to the fact that the females can fly, unlike in European fireflies, and in 2020 it had already reached France. At this rate of expansion, it is estimated that in less than 40 years it could occupy metropolitan France and the Iberian Peninsula entirely, so control programs for the species may be necessary to avoid putting native species at risk.

== Gallery ==
Photinus signaticollis

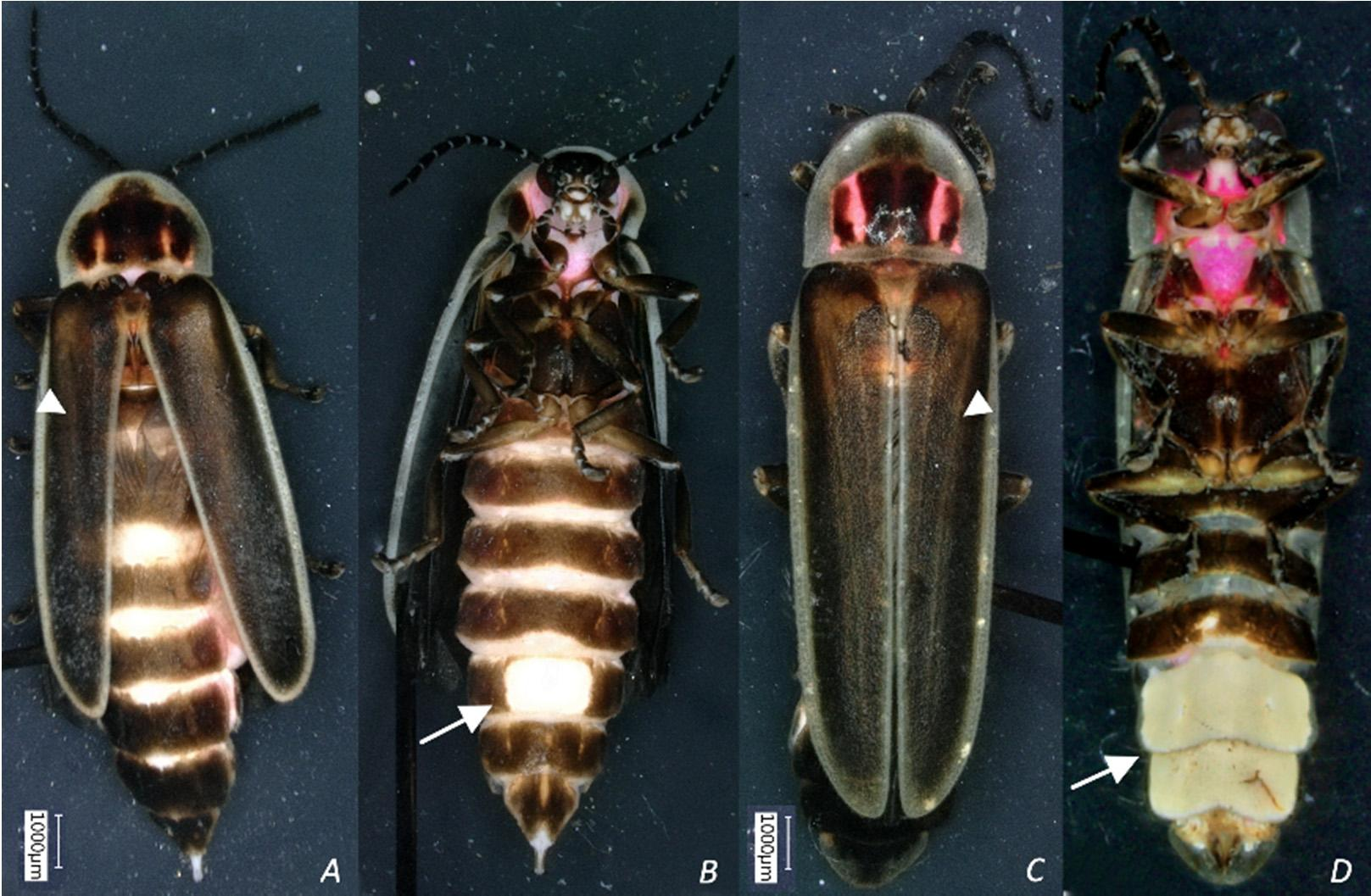
Adult female, dorsal view (A) and ventral view (B); adult male, dorsal view (C) and ventral view (D).

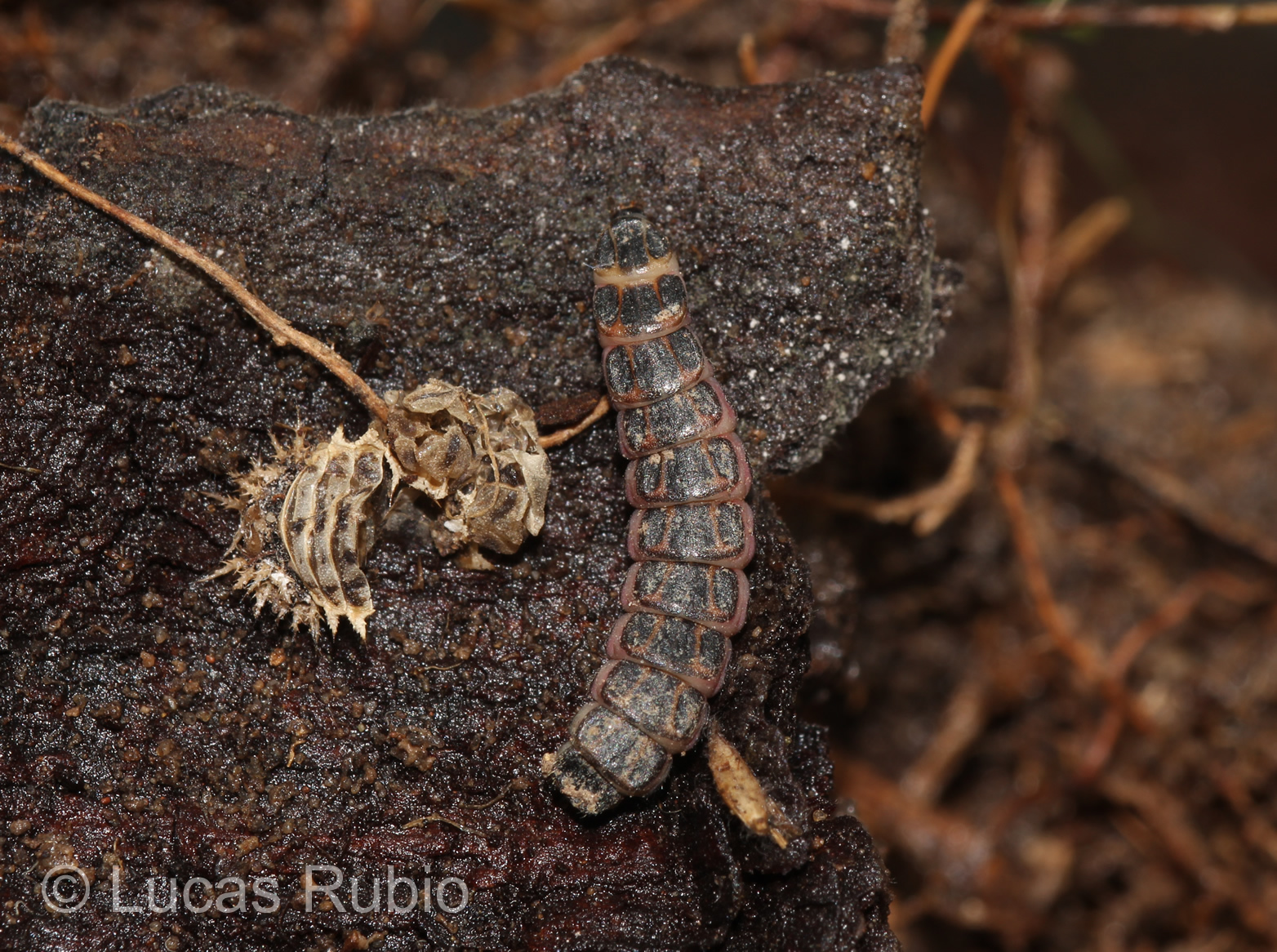
Larva.

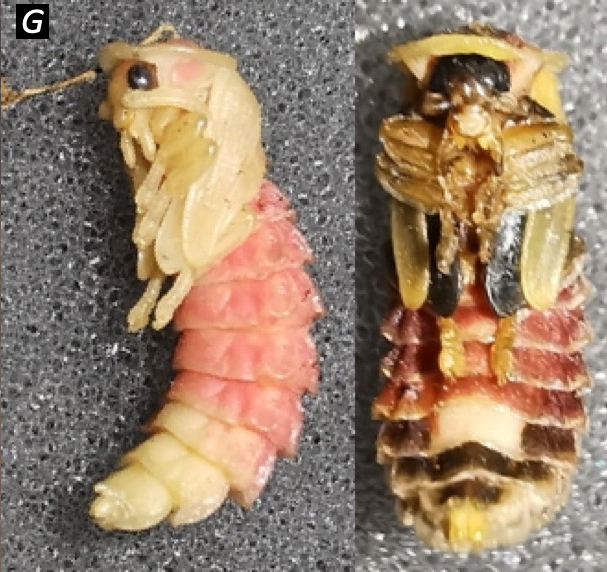
Pupae : male on the left, female on the right.

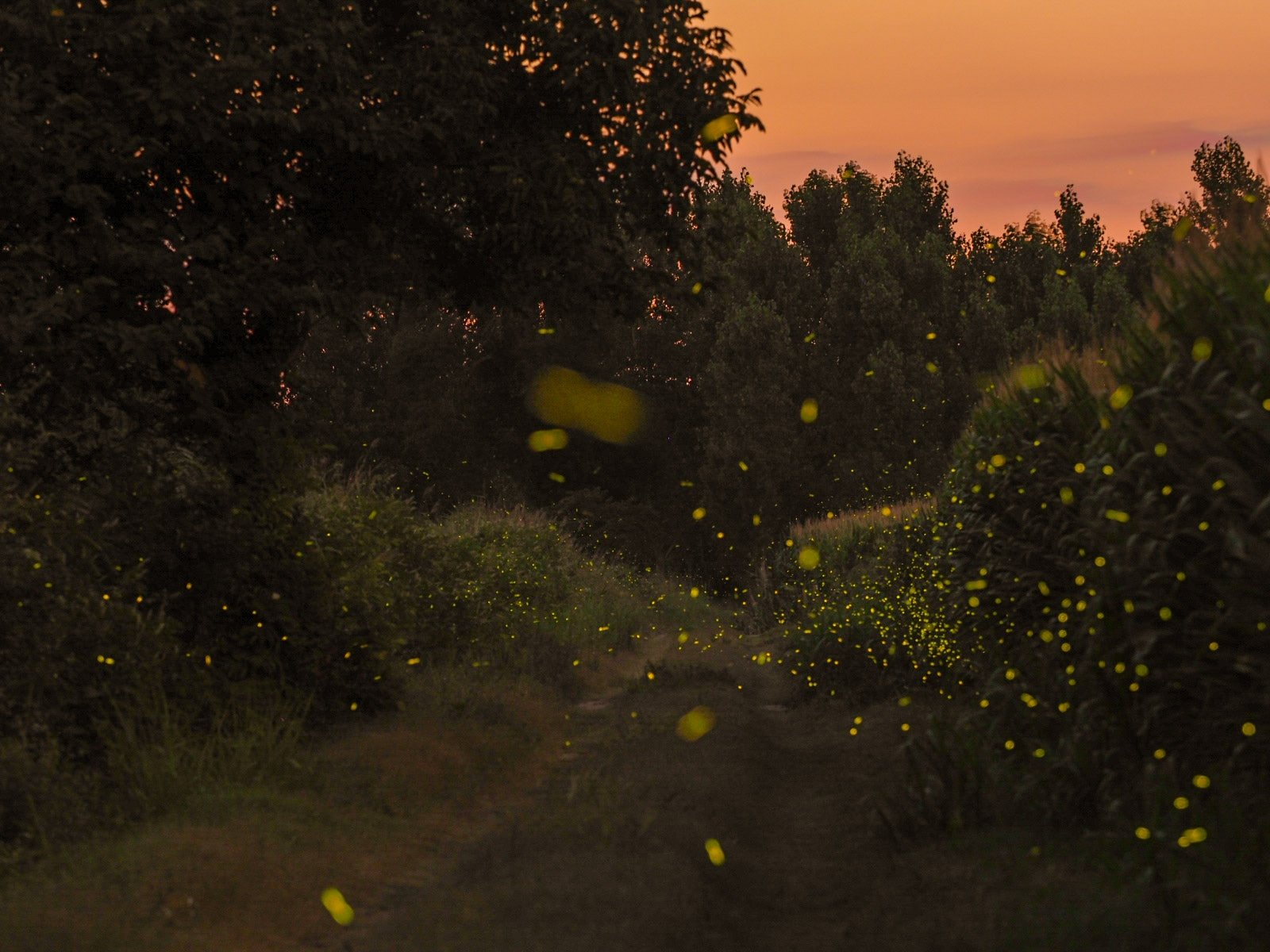
Flight of light in Girona (Catalonia, Spain).

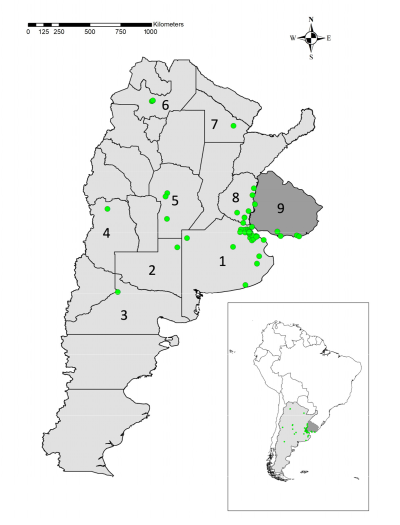
Actual distribution in South America (Argentina and Uruguay).

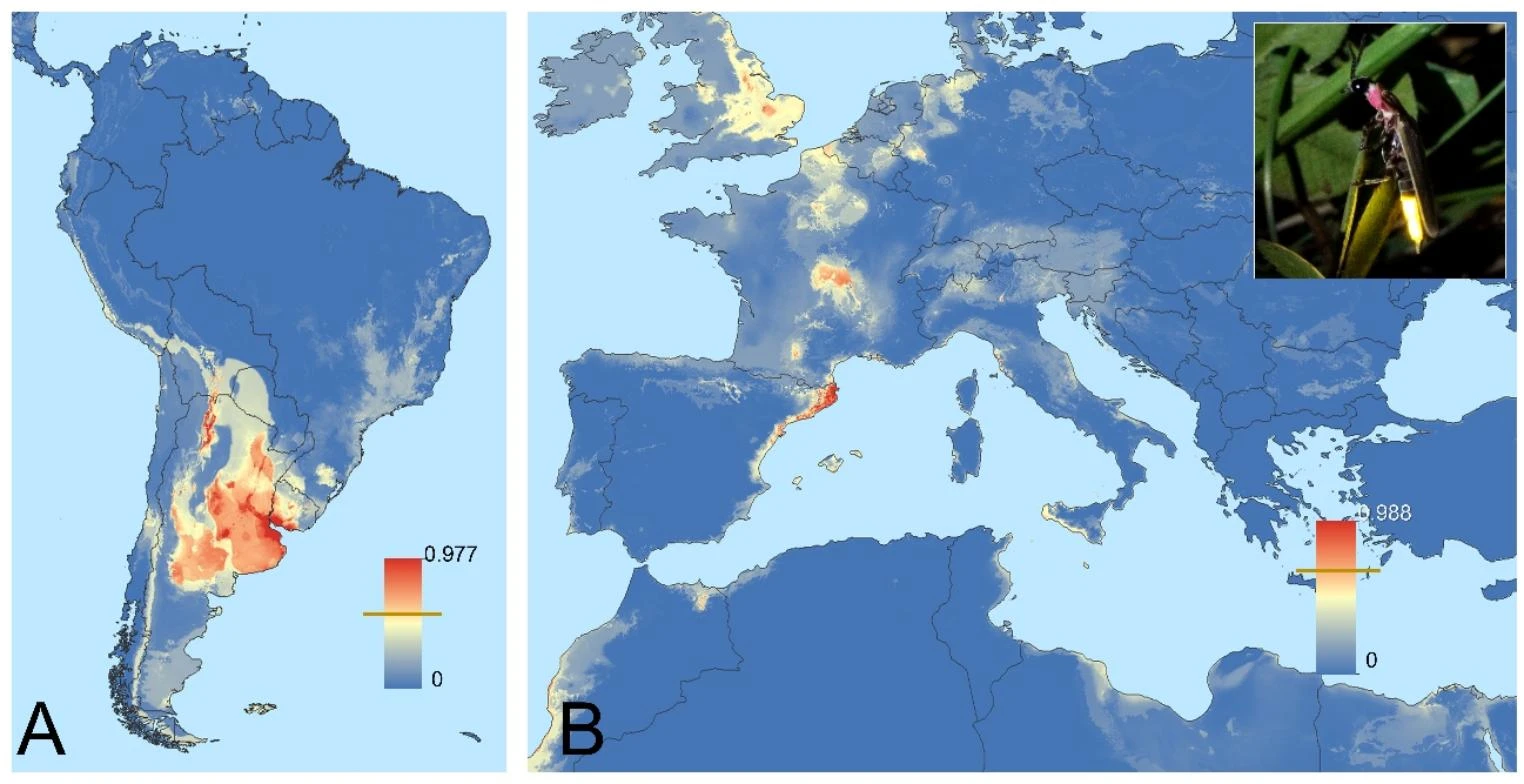
Modelling the areas colonizable by Photinus signaticollis in South America, Europe and North Africa.
