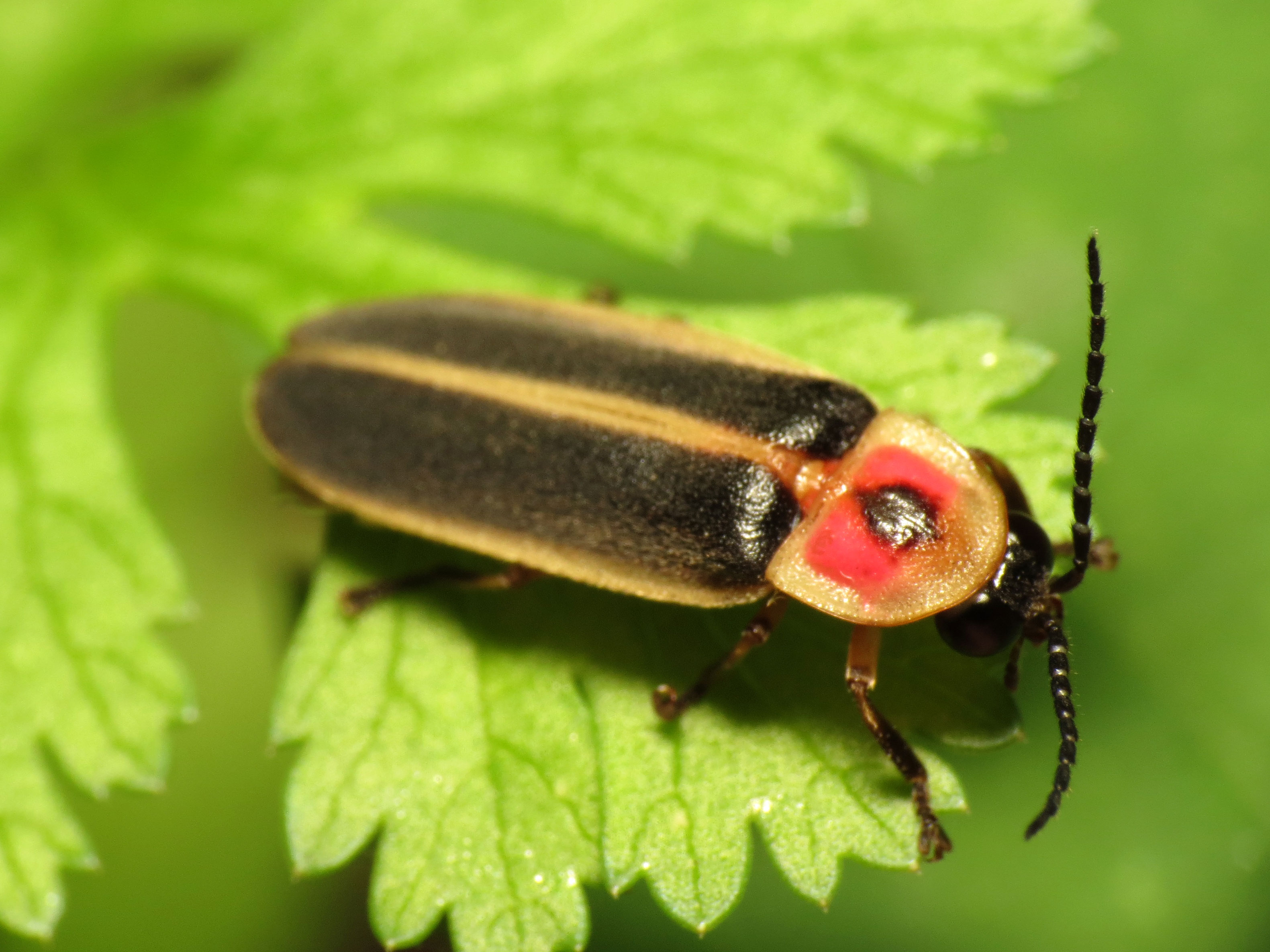
- Eastern Firefly, Photinus pyralis

Scientific classification
- Kingdom: Animalia
- Phylum: Arthropoda
- Clade: Pancrustacea
- Class: Insecta
- Order: Coleoptera
- Suborder: Polyphaga
- Infraorder: Elateriformia
- Family: Lampyridae
- Subfamily: Lampyrinae
- Tribe: Photinini
- Genus: Photinus; Laporte, 1833

Species
- Numerous, see text

= Photinus (beetle) =

Genus of fireflies

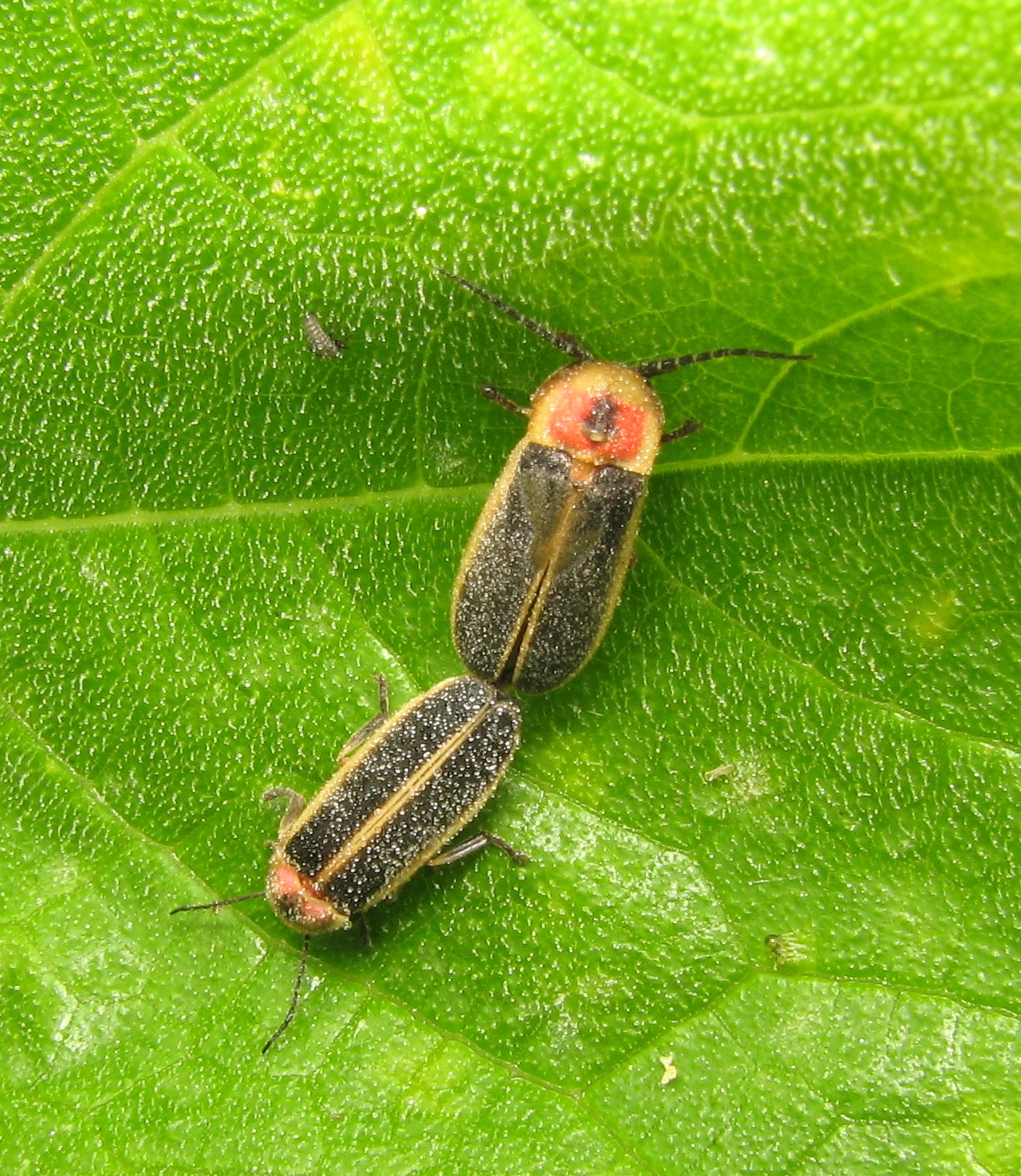
Photinus sp., mating pair

The rover fireflies (Photinus) are a genus of fireflies (family Lampyridae). They are the type genus of tribe Photinini in subfamily Lampyrinae. This genus contains, for example, the common eastern firefly (P. pyralis), the most common species of firefly in North America.

Male Photinus beetles of some species emit a flashing light pattern to signal for females. Illegitimate receivers, such as female Photuris beetles, identify these signals and use them to locate the male Photinus, attract them with deceptive signals, and eat them. An important study on the diversity of species in the USA and their visual communication was by Lloyd (1966)

== Systematics ==
The closest living relative of the rover fireflies is not yet determined with certainty. In morphology, they resemble their predators, the Photurinae, but they are quite certainly not at all closely related as fireflies go. Rather, the genus Ellychnia is either the closest relative of Photinus, or might even be included in it. Ellychnia are notable for having lost the ability to produce light again, and like the ancestors of all fireflies, communicate with pheromones only. It might thus be warranted to remove some species from Photinus and assign them different genera.

The genus Pyropyga is also a close relative, though it is certainly not as close as Ellychnia. This group makes up the core of the tribe Photinini, and in fact it seems warranted to restrict the tribe to these genera, but more research is still needed, in particular with regard to Photinus and Ellychnia, as the relationship of their type species ("Photinus pallens" and Ellychnia corrusca) remains completely unknown, with the latter also suspected to be a cryptic species complex. Tropical species of Photinus are also not well studied.

=== Selected species ===
- Photinus ardens
- Photinus brimleyi – sidewinder firefly
- Photinus carolinus – Smokies synchronous firefly
- Photinus collustrans
- Photinus concisus
- Photinus consanguineus – double cousin firefly
- Photinus consimilis – cattail flash-train firefly
- Photinus cookii – Cook's firefly
- Photinus curtatus
- Photinus dimissus
- Photinus harveyi
- Photinus ignitus
- Photinus immaculatus
- Photinus indictus – silent firefly
- Photinus knulli
- Photinus macdermotti – Father Mac's firefly, "Mr. Mac"
- Photinus marginellus
- Photinus obscurellus
- Photinus punctulatus
- Photinus pyralis – common eastern firefly, big dipper firefly
- Photinus sabulosus
- Photinus signaticollis
- Photinus stellaris
- Photinus tenuicinctus – thinly-girdled firefly, "Ozark spark"
- Photinus texanus
