= Photinus concisus =

Scientific classification
- Domain: Eukaryota
- Kingdom: Animalia
- Phylum: Arthropoda
- Class: Insecta
- Order: Coleoptera
- Suborder: Polyphaga
- Infraorder: Elateriformia
- Family: Lampyridae
- Genus: Photinus
- Species: P. concisus

Binomial name
- Photinus concisus Lloyd, 1968

Species of firefly

Photinus concisus is a species of firefly in the beetle family Lampyridae. It is found in Kerrville, Texas. It the species most closely related to Photinus pyralis.
