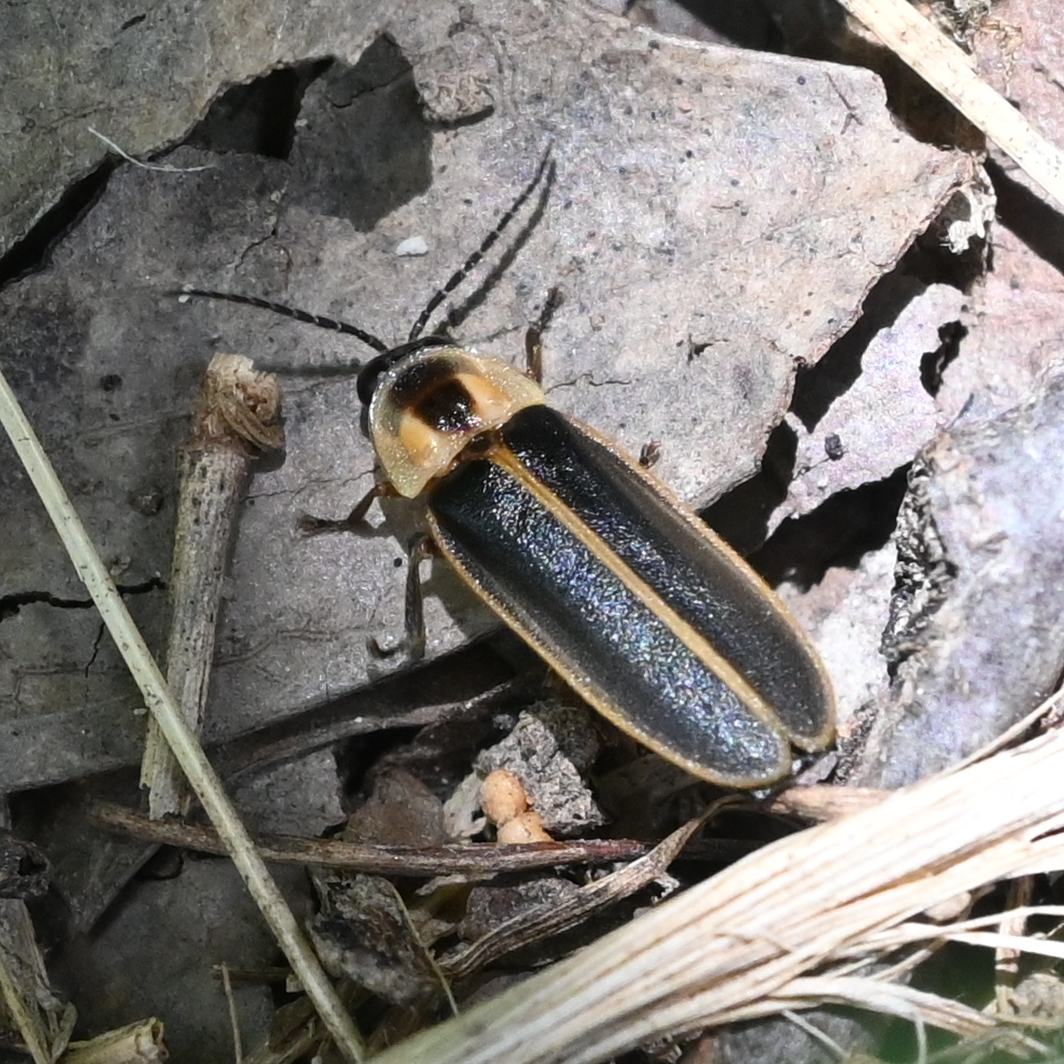

Conservation status
- Data Deficient (IUCN 3.1)

Scientific classification
- Kingdom: Animalia
- Phylum: Arthropoda
- Clade: Pancrustacea
- Class: Insecta
- Order: Coleoptera
- Suborder: Polyphaga
- Infraorder: Elateriformia
- Family: Lampyridae
- Genus: Photinus
- Species: P. tenuicinctus

Binomial name
- Photinus tenuicinctus Green, 1956

= Photinus tenuicinctus =

Species of beetle

Photinus tenuicinctus, or thinly-girdled firefly or Ozark spark, is a species of firefly in the beetle family Lampyridae. It is found in the Ozarks in Arkansas and Oklahoma.

== Description ==
P. tenuicinctus is a medium-sized beetle, with adults that measure about 8.5–11.5 mm (0.3–0.5 in) long. The head shield, or pronotum, is pale yellow with a dark central mark that is broader at the top, slightly narrowing posteriorly and almost reaching the base of the pronotum. The wing covers, or elytra, are dark with very narrow light-colored margins. The male has lanterns in segments 6 and 7 of its abdomen, and the female has only one lantern. The male has elytra that extend the length of its abdomen, but the female is brachypterous and cannot fly, with short elytra that reach only slightly beyond its first abdominal segment.

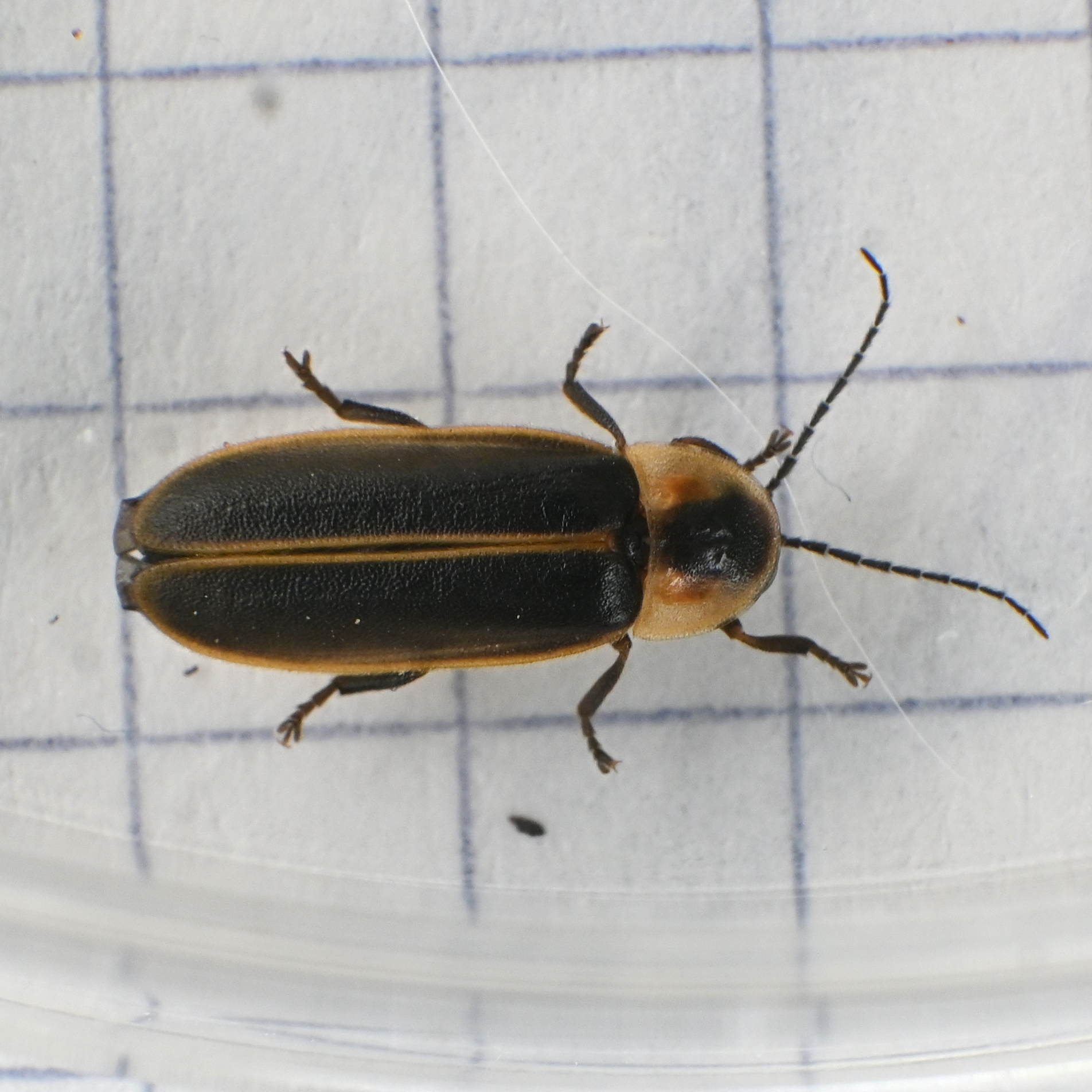
Dorsal view of the Photinus tenuicinctus firefly, the Ozark spark

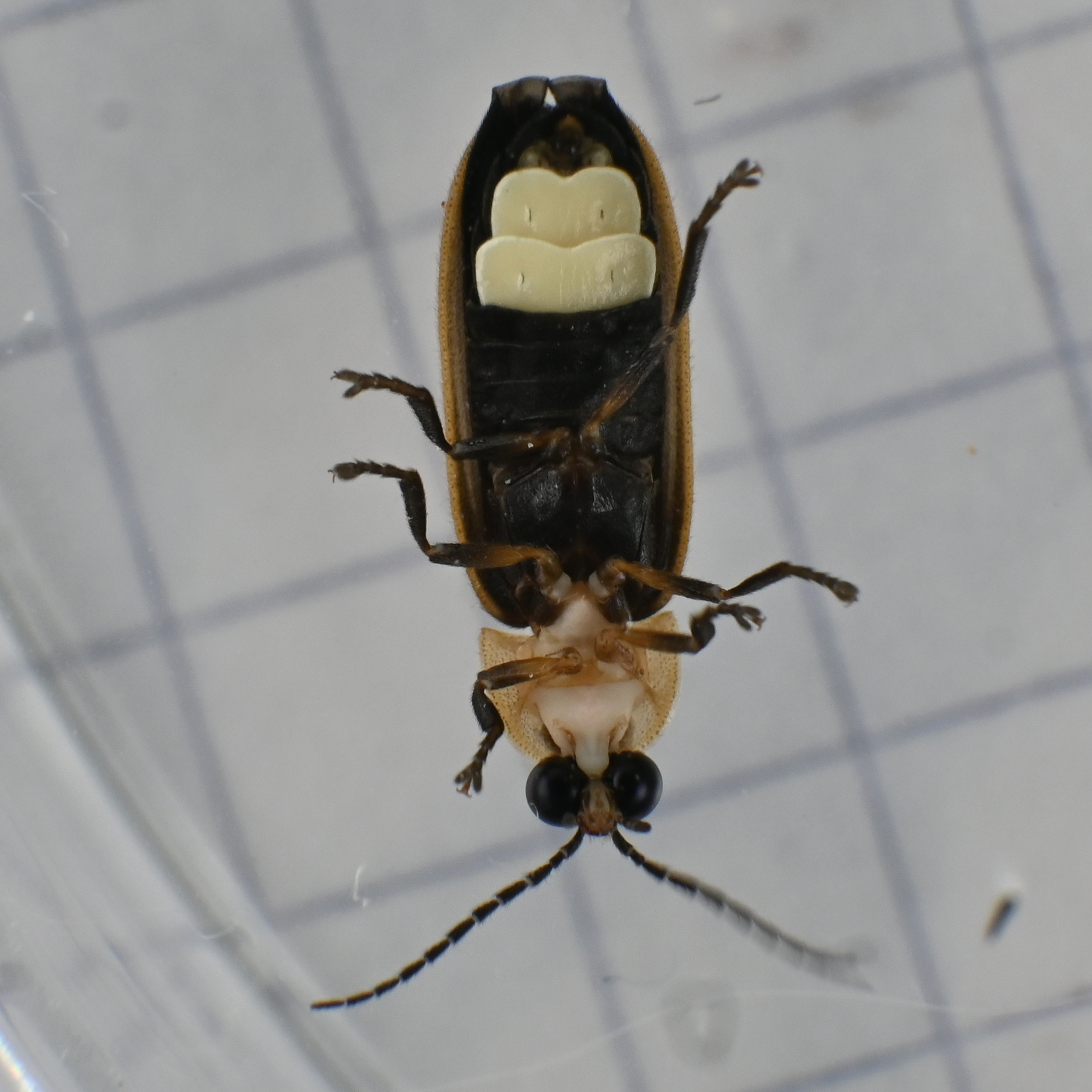
Ventral view of the Photinus tenuicinctus firefly, the Ozark spark

== Etymology ==
The specific epithet refers to the pale border on the elytra, which is thinner than on other Photinus species.

== Life Cycle ==
Beetles such as P. tenuicinctus go through four life stages: egg, larva, pupa, and adult. Photinus fireflies spend the majority of their lives as larvae, which are bioluminescent and likely live below the soil surface, eating snails, worms, and other soft-bodied invertebrates.

== Behavior ==
Adult male P. tenuicinctus fireflies fly 1–2 m (3–7 ft) off the ground and flash to attract the attention of females. Males cover a distance of about 2 meters between single, sharp flashes, which are about 0.15 seconds in duration and are emitted every 1.5 seconds or so, depending on temperature. Female response flashes consist of a single flash, 0.8 seconds in length, at a short time delay (0.4 seconds). Females cannot fly.

== Habitat ==
These fireflies have been seen in forests and shaded lawns.

== Range ==
P. tenuicinctus has only been recorded in eastern Oklahoma and northern Arkansas, in the Ozarks.
