= Photinus collustrans =

Conservation status
- Data Deficient (IUCN 3.1)

Scientific classification
- Kingdom: Animalia
- Phylum: Arthropoda
- Class: Insecta
- Order: Coleoptera
- Suborder: Polyphaga
- Infraorder: Elateriformia
- Family: Lampyridae
- Genus: Photinus
- Species: P. collustrans

Binomial name
- Photinus collustrans LeConte, 1878

Species of beetle

Photinus collustrans is a species of firefly in the beetle family Lampyridae. It is found in North America.
