= Photinus stellaris =

Scientific classification
- Domain: Eukaryota
- Kingdom: Animalia
- Phylum: Arthropoda
- Class: Insecta
- Order: Coleoptera
- Suborder: Polyphaga
- Infraorder: Elateriformia
- Family: Lampyridae
- Genus: Photinus
- Species: P. stellaris

Binomial name
- Photinus stellaris Fall, 1927

Species of beetle

Photinus stellaris is a species of firefly in the family Lampyridae, which belongs to suborder Polyphaga -a group that includes water, rove, scarab, long-horned, leaf and snout beetles. It is found in North America.
