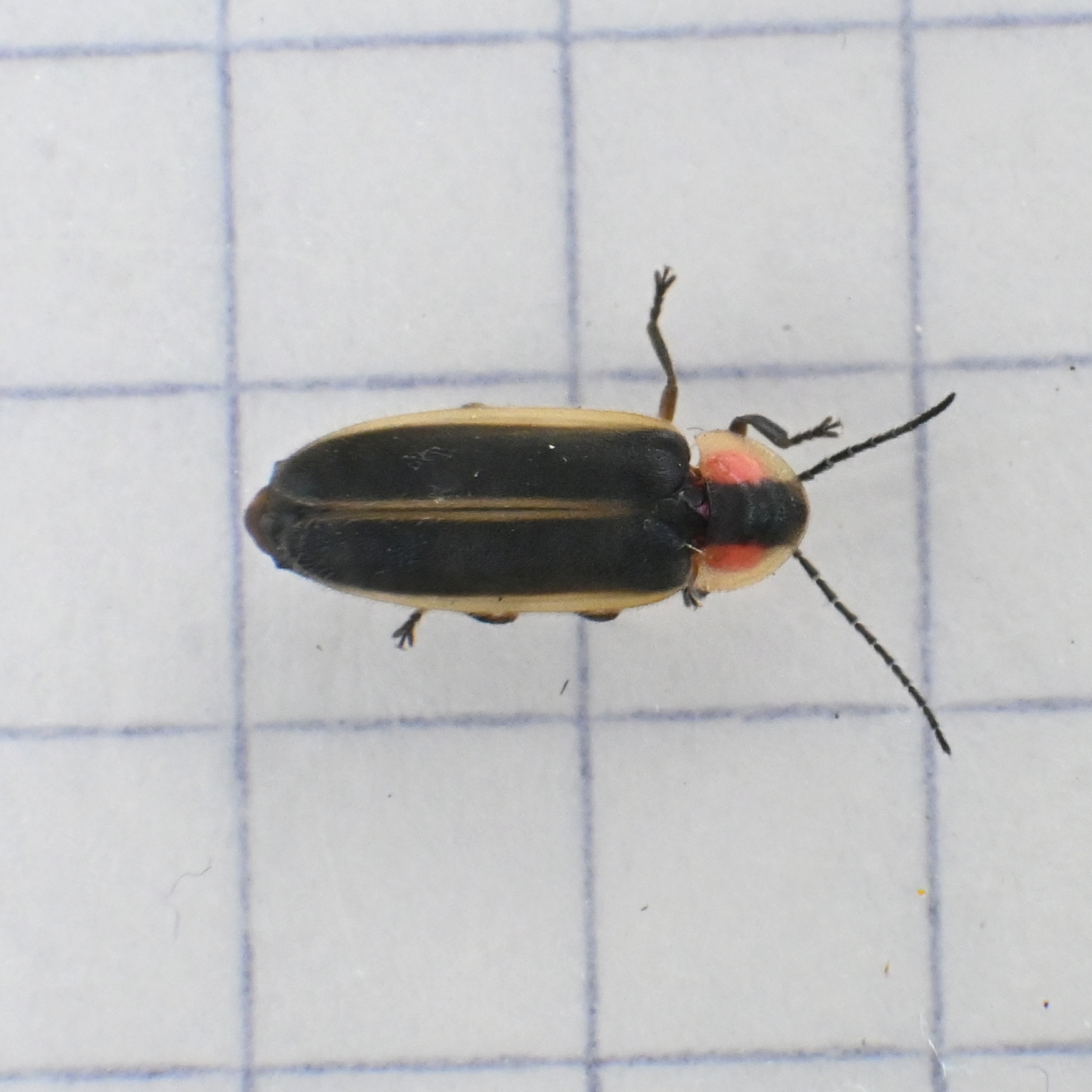

Conservation status
- Data Deficient (IUCN 3.1)

Scientific classification
- Kingdom: Animalia
- Phylum: Arthropoda
- Clade: Pancrustacea
- Class: Insecta
- Order: Coleoptera
- Suborder: Polyphaga
- Infraorder: Elateriformia
- Family: Lampyridae
- Genus: Photinus
- Species: P. cookii

Binomial name
- Photinus cookii Green, 1956

= Photinus cookii =

Species of beetle

Photinus cookii, or Cook's firefly is a species of day-active firefly in the beetle family Lampyridae. It is found in North America in the Eastern US, including Florida and Texas.

== Description ==
P. cookii is a small beetle, with adults measuring 5–7 mm (0.2–0.3 in) long. The wing covers, or elytra, are dark, with wide, light-colored side margins. The head shield, or pronotum, is pale yellow with a dark bar in the center, reaching from the top of the pronotum to the base. The body has short hairs, which are visible with a microscope. P. cookii does not have working lanterns on its abdomen, although there may be small vestigial lanterns or light patches on the final 2 segments. The males and the females are similar in appearance.

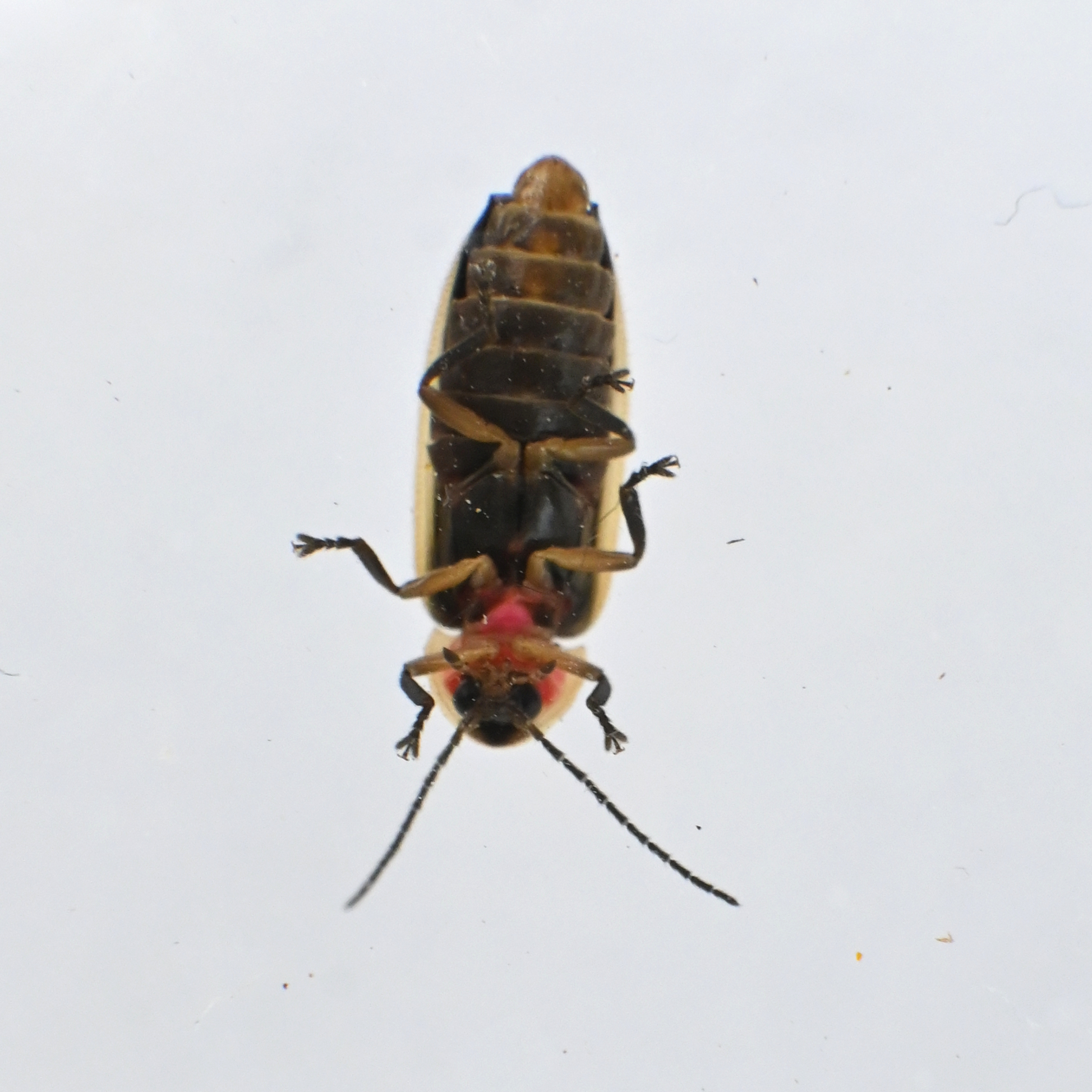
Ventral view of Photinus cookii, Cook's firefly

== Etymology ==
The genus name Photinus is from the Greek word for shining or bright. The species was first described by John Wagener Green in 1956. The species is named as an honorific for Mr. Carl Cook, who had collected the holotype male and other specimens in Carilhope, Kentucky, 11-VII-1946. The species name is therefore noun in genitive case.

Several years later Lloyd (1966) published an overview of Photinus in USA, and wrote the name as "Photinus cooki" (i.e. altering the ending to a single "i" as "cooki"), perhaps considering it as a correction; but per nomenclatural regulations in ICZN 31.1, the original spelling of "cookii" is admissible and therefore it is subsequently retained.

== Life cycle ==
Beetles such as P. cookii go through four life stages: egg, larva, pupa, and adult. Photinus fireflies spend the majority of their lives as larvae, which are bioluminescent and likely live below the soil surface, eating snails, worms, and other soft-bodied invertebrates. Adult P. cookii appear in summer, in June and July.

== Behavior ==
P. cookii is a non-flashing firefly, active during the day rather than at night. It is believed that these fireflies locate a mate using pheromones.

== Habitat ==
Adults are seen during the day in gardens, yards, open woodlands, fencerows, and open areas.

== Range ==
This species has been reported from Missouri to the north, Alabama to the south, North Carolina to the east, and Texas to the west.
