= Photinus punctulatus =

Conservation status
- Data Deficient (IUCN 3.1)

Scientific classification
- Kingdom: Animalia
- Phylum: Arthropoda
- Clade: Pancrustacea
- Class: Insecta
- Order: Coleoptera
- Suborder: Polyphaga
- Infraorder: Elateriformia
- Family: Lampyridae
- Genus: Photinus
- Species: P. punctulatus

Binomial name
- Photinus punctulatus LeConte, 1852

Species of beetle

Photinus punctulatus, or punctate firefly, is a species of firefly in the beetle family Lampyridae. It is found in the central United States.

== Description ==
P. punctulatus is a small to medium-sized beetle, with adults that measure about 5–11 mm (0.2–0.4 in) long. The head shield, or pronotum, is pale yellow and red with a dark central mark that is broader at the top, slightly narrowing posteriorly and almost reaching the base of the pronotum. The texture of the pronotum is pitted. The wing covers, or elytra, are dark with light-colored margins. The male has lanterns in segments 6 and 7 of its abdomen, and the female has only one lantern. The male has elytra that extend the length of its abdomen, but the female is brachypterous and cannot fly, with short elytra that reach only slightly beyond its first abdominal segment.

== Etymology ==
The specific epithet refers to the small dots or depressions on the pronotum.

== Life Cycle ==
Beetles such as P. punctulatus go through four life stages: egg, larva, pupa, and adult. Photinus fireflies spend the majority of their lives as larvae, which are bioluminescent and likely live below the soil surface, eating snails, worms, and other soft-bodied invertebrates.

== Behavior ==
Adult male P. punctulatus fireflies fly 1–2 m (3–7 ft) off the ground and flash to attract the attention of females, who perch on the tips of grass blades near the ground. Males cover a distance of about 1 to 2 meters between single, sharp flashes, which are about 0.15 seconds in duration and are emitted about once a second, depending on temperature. Female response flashes consist of a single flash, averaging 0.36 seconds in length, at a short time delay (0.32 seconds). Females cannot fly.

== Habitat ==
These fireflies are found in lawns and meadows with tall grass.

== Range ==
P. punctulatus is found in the central US, from Texas to Illinois.
