= George Brimley =

English essayist (1819–1857)

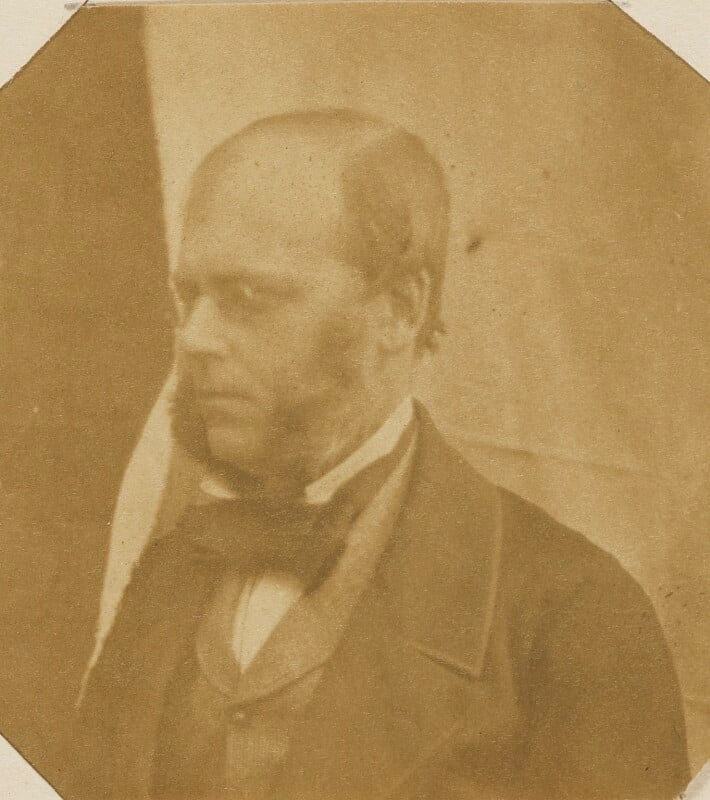
Brimley c. 1855

George Brimley (29 December 1819, Cambridge - 29 May 1857) was an English essayist.

== Life ==
George Brimley was born at Cambridge on 29 December 1819, and from the age of eleven to that of sixteen was educated at a school in Totteridge, Hertfordshire. In October 1838 he was entered at Trinity College, Cambridge, where in 1841 he was elected a scholar. He was reading with good hopes for classical honours, and was a private pupil of Dr. Vaughan; but even at that early age he was suffering from the disease to which he eventually succumbed. Although the state of his health prevented him from competing for university honours or obtaining a college fellowship, he was known to possess ability; and soon after taking his degree he was appointed college librarian (4 June 1845). He held this office until a few weeks before his death, when he returned to his father's house. Physical weakness prevented the sustained effort necessary for the production of any important work; but for the last six years of his life he contributed to the press.

Most of his writings appeared in The Spectator or in Fraser's Magazine, the only one to which his name was attached being an essay on Tennyson's poems, contributed to the Cambridge Essays of 1855. He died 29 May 1857. A selection of his essays was made after his death and published with a prefatory memoir by W. G. Clark. This volume contains notices of a large number of the writers who were contemporary with Brimley himself, and is of considerable value as representing the contemporary judgment by a man of cultivation and acuteness on the writers of the middle of the nineteenth century, most of whom are now being judged by posterity. Sir Arthur Helps said of him, 'He was certainly, as it appeared to me, one of the finest critics of the present day.'
