= Photinus immaculatus =

Scientific classification
- Domain: Eukaryota
- Kingdom: Animalia
- Phylum: Arthropoda
- Class: Insecta
- Order: Coleoptera
- Suborder: Polyphaga
- Infraorder: Elateriformia
- Family: Lampyridae
- Genus: Photinus
- Species: P. immaculatus

Binomial name
- Photinus immaculatus Green, 1956

Species of beetle

Photinus immaculatus is a species of firefly in the beetle family Lampyridae. It is found in North America.
