= Clement Samuel Brimley =

English-American zoologist

- Born: 18 December 1863; Buckinghamshire, England
- Died: 23 July 1946 (aged 82)
- Citizenship: American
- Scientific career
- Fields: Zoology
- Workplaces: North Carolina Museum of Natural Sciences
- Author abbrev. (zoology): C.S. Brimley

Clement Samuel Brimley (18 December 1863 – 23 July 1946) was a self-trained zoologist who worked at the North Carolina Museum of Natural Sciences. His brother, H.H. Brimley, was a zoologist and long-time director of the same museum. Both Brimley brothers are buried at Historic Oakwood Cemetery in Raleigh. Brimley's chorus frog and the firefly Photinus brimleyi were named for C.S. Brimley.
