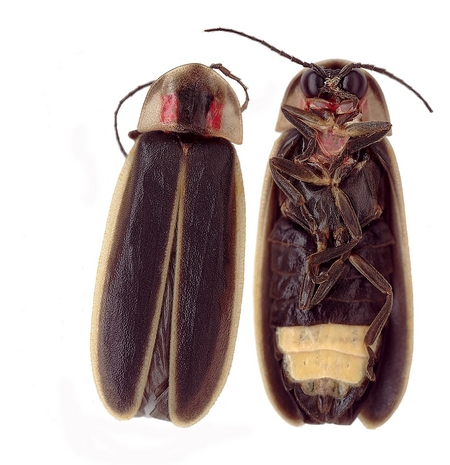

Conservation status
- Least Concern (IUCN 3.1)

Scientific classification
- Kingdom: Animalia
- Phylum: Arthropoda
- Clade: Pancrustacea
- Class: Insecta
- Order: Coleoptera
- Suborder: Polyphaga
- Infraorder: Elateriformia
- Family: Lampyridae
- Genus: Photinus
- Species: P. carolinus

Binomial name
- Photinus carolinus Green, 1956

= Photinus carolinus =

Species of beetle

Photinus carolinus, commonly known as the Smokies synchronous firefly, is a species of rover firefly whose mating displays of synchronous flashing have fascinated both scientists and tourists. As individual females synchronize with males nearby, waves of alternating bright light and darkness seem to travel across the landscape. Firefly displays typically occur in early June near Elkmont, Tennessee, in the Great Smoky Mountains National Park, near Gatlinburg. The species can be found in isolated pockets of the Appalachian Mountains in the eastern United States.

== Description ==
P. carolinus is a medium-sized beetle, with adults measuring 11–15 mm (0.4–0.6 in) long. The adults have dark wing covers, or elytra, with light-colored side margins, and a pale yellow head shield, or pronotum, with a dark rectangular mark in the center and very thin black edging on the sides. Males have pale lanterns on segments 6 and 7 of their abdomen, and females have one lantern on segment 6. The rest of the abdomen is uniformly dark.

== Etymology ==
The specific epithet refers to North Carolina, where the species was originally found.

== Life cycle ==
Beetles such as P. carolinus go through four life stages: egg, larva, pupa, and adult. Photinus fireflies spend the majority of their lives as larvae, which are bioluminescent and likely live below the soil surface, eating snails, worms, and other soft-bodied invertebrates. Adults appear in early summer, from late May to June.

== Behavior ==
A typical Photinus is a "lightning-bug firefly" (as opposed to the so-called "glowworm firefly") because it emits light in its winged (imago) stage. Both male and female adults produce mating signals with an abdominal light organ or "lantern". Members of Photinus are called "rover fireflies" because typically males fly about singly, not in groups, flashing a species-specific pattern until a receptive female responds with her species-specific flashing signal.

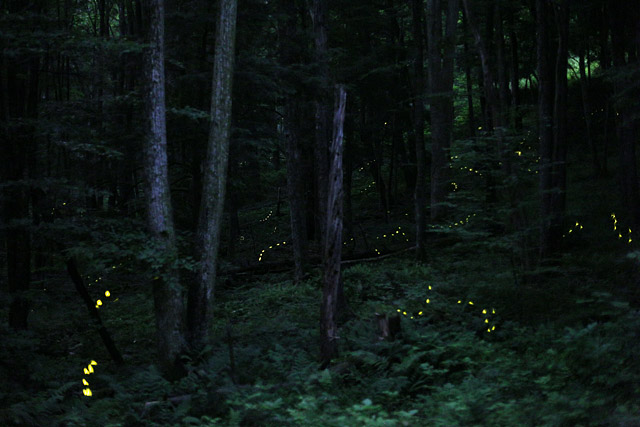
Photinus Carolinus fireflies in Pennsylvania, 2013

P. carolinus was the first North American species found to show synchronized flashing behavior. Synchronized flashing by male fireflies is common in South Asia, where huge aggregates of males perch on specific trees to create a bright display of flashing. The synchronized flashing of P. carolinus males occurs in aggregates of flying fireflies.

The timing of flashing depends somewhat on temperature, but the flash pattern of a male P. carolinus is typically four to eight very bright flashes emitted over two to four seconds, followed by a dark period of eight to 12 seconds. The female reply is much less bright, a pulsed signal during the dark period of the male. Scientists have suggested one reason for the synchronized flashing is to create a synchronized dark period, during which males can search for female responses without being distracted by signals from other males.

When males of P. carolinus detect a female response, a cluster of males forms around the female. When she lands, the males land nearby but not directly on top of her. As many as 20 males may energetically walk, flash, and attempt to mount the female or nearby males. The female does not necessarily mate with the first male to reach her, but may avoid several males before permitting one to begin copulation. In the early stages of copulation, other males may try to separate the couple, but once the mating pair has moved to stage 2 copulation (tail-to-tail), the unmated males fly off to seek females elsewhere.

== Habitat ==
In the southern part of its range, P. carolinus is usually found in hardwood forests that are 65 years old or older, in mountain river valleys at elevations from 1,400–6,000 feet (430–1,830 m). In Pennsylvania and New York, the species is found at lower elevations, 1,000–2,000 feet (300–610 m).

== Range ==
P. carolinus is found in isolated pockets throughout the Appalachian Mountains, including in northern Georgia, Tennessee, South Carolina, North Carolina, Virginia, West Virginia, Pennsylvania, and New York. One of its small populations is in Elkmont, Tennessee. The species is also found elsewhere in the Smoky Mountains, usually at elevations near 2,000 feet (610 m), and has been observed as far north as Pennsylvania.

== Tourist attraction ==
Increasing numbers of people come each year to a trailhead near Elkmont to see them. Scientists use a degree day model to try to predict the onset of each year's peak display.

Driving and parking near Great Smoky Mountains National Park are strictly regulated during the two-week P. carolinus mating season. Would-be visitors are required to park at the Sugarlands Visitor Center and wait for a trolley to take them to the viewing site. On weekends there may be a four-hour wait for transportation.

The firefly display near Elkmont attracted more than a thousand visitors nightly in early June 2011. A biologist who has studied the fireflies expressed concern about increased crowds at the park, saying, "The bulk of people are respectful ... But the total number of people is obscene."
