= Herbert Hutchinson Brimley =

British-American zoologist

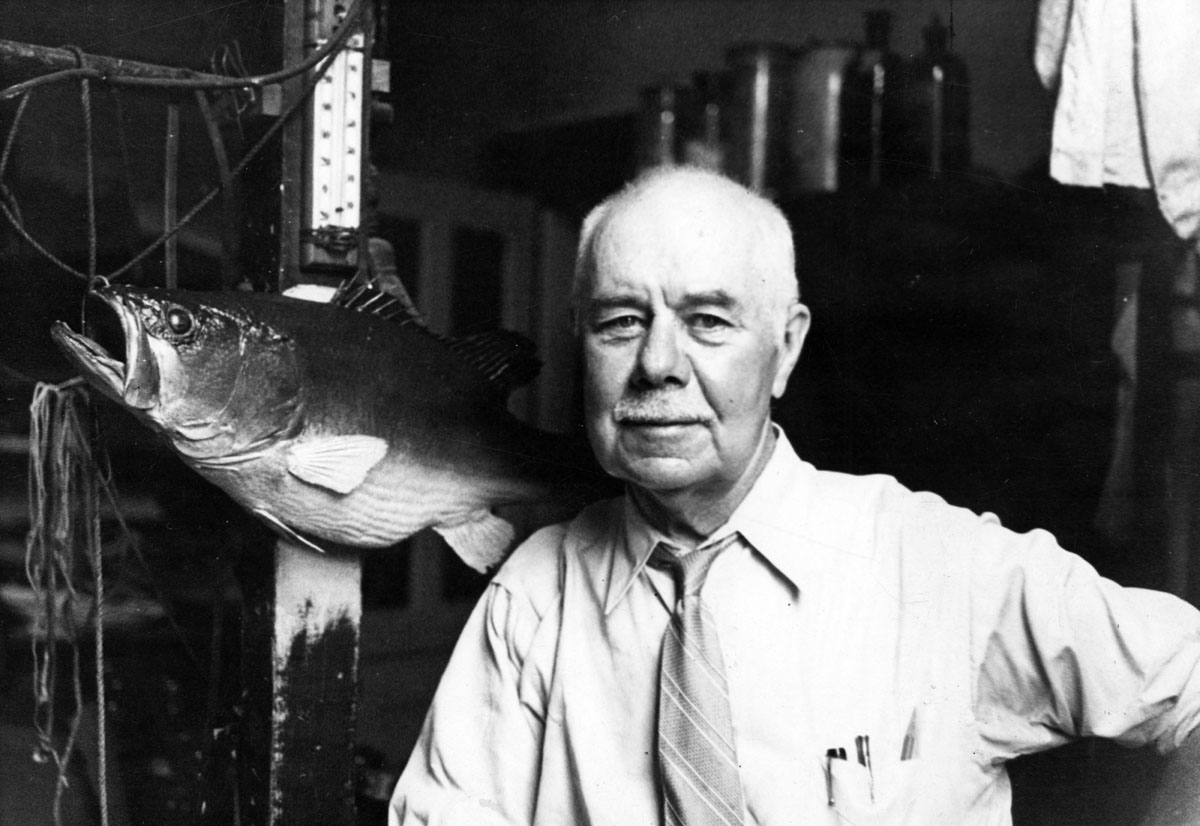
- Brimley in 1934
- Born: 7 March 1861; Willington, Bedfordshire, England
- Died: 4 April 1946 (aged 85); Raleigh, North Carolina, United States
- Citizenship: American
- Scientific career
- Fields: Zoology
- Workplaces: North Carolina Museum of Natural Sciences

Herbert Hutchinson Brimley (7 March 1861 – 4 April 1946) was a self-trained zoologist and long-time director of the North Carolina Museum of Natural Sciences. His brother, C.S. Brimley, was also a zoologist who worked at the same museum. Both Brimley brothers are buried at Historic Oakwood Cemetery in Raleigh.

== References and external links ==
- Collecting Nature: The Beginning of the North Carolina Museum of Natural Sciences—accessed 19 June 2008
- North Carolina State Archives Photo Gallery--Herbert Hutchinson Brimley—accessed 19 June 2008
- University of Iowa, Museum of Natural History--A Whale for Iowa—accessed 19 June 2008
- Historic Oakwood Cemetery—grave listings, accessed 27 June 2008
- Journal of the North Carolina Academy of Sciences Collection—accessed 19 June 2008
- Herbert Hutchinson Brimley, 1949. A North Carolina Naturalist: H.H. Brimley: Selections from His Writings. Chapel Hill, North Carolina: University of North Carolina Press, 205 pp.
