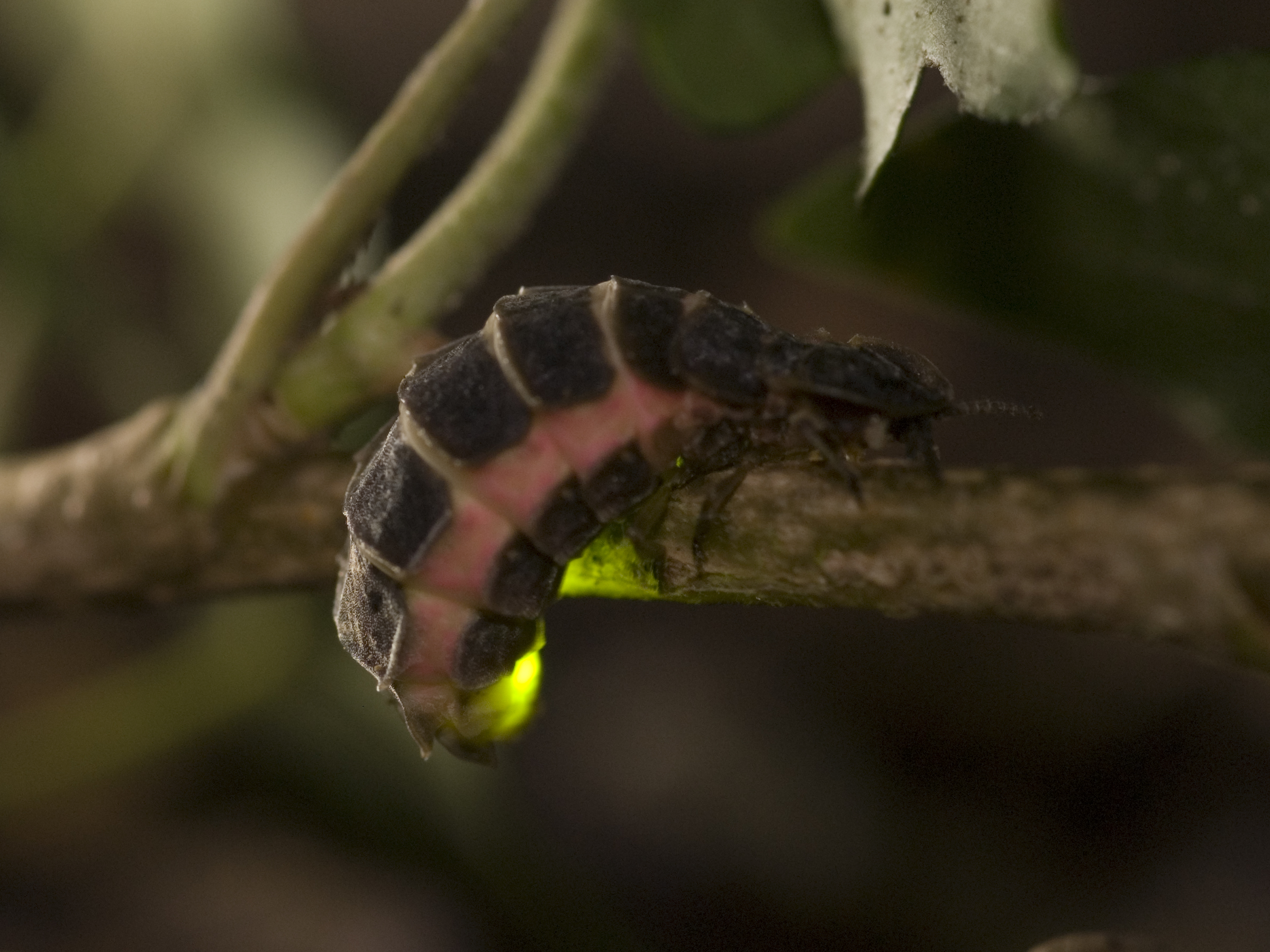
- Egg-laden female of Lampyris noctiluca

Scientific classification
- Kingdom: Animalia
- Phylum: Arthropoda
- Clade: Pancrustacea
- Class: Insecta
- Order: Coleoptera
- Suborder: Polyphaga
- Infraorder: Elateriformia
- Superfamily: Elateroidea
- Family: Lampyridae
- Subfamily: Lampyrinae
- Tribe: Lampyrini; Rafinesque, 1815

Synonyms
- Pleotomini

= Lampyrini =

Tribe of beetles

The Lampyrini are a tribe of fireflies in the large subfamily Lampyrinae. The lineage formerly separated as Pleotomini seems to be a specialized offshoot of the Lampyrini not too distant from the type genus Lampyris and is therefore included here. This tribe occurs throughout the Holarctic and contains the typical "glowing" or "continuous-light" fireflies from that region. Some otherwise very advanced Lampyrini, like species in Paraphausis and Pyrocoelia, have degenerated light-producing organs again and communicate primarily or even exclusively with pheromones like the ancestors of the fireflies did.

== Systematics ==
The group has recently been examined using molecular phylogenetics, using fairly comprehensive sampling.

== Genera ==
- Afrodiaphanes Geisthardt, 2007^{i c g}
- Diaphanes Motschulsky, 1853^{i c g}
- Lampyris Geoffroy, 1762^{i c g}
- Lychnobius Geisthardt, 1983^{i c g}
- Microlampyris Pic, 1956^{i c g}
- Microphotus LeConte, 1866^{i c g b}
- Nelsonphotus Cicero, 2006^{i c g b}
- Nyctophila E. Olivier, 1884^{i c g}
- Ovalampis Fairmaire, 1898^{i c g}
- Paraphausis Green, 1949^{i c g b}
- Pelania Mulsant, 1860^{i c g}
- Petalacmis E. Olivier, 1908^{i c g}
- Prolutacea Cicero, 2006^{i c g b}
- Pyrocoelia Gorham, 1880^{i c g}

Data sources: i = ITIS, c = Catalogue of Life, g = GBIF, b = Bugguide.net
