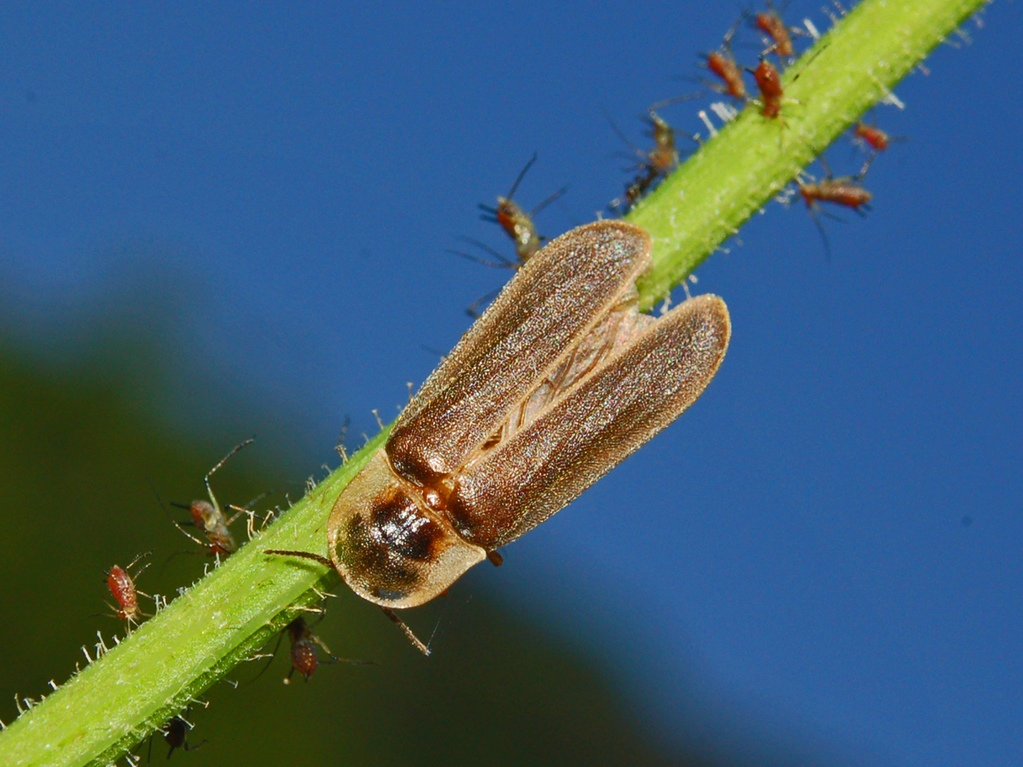
- Male of Lampyris noctiluca

Scientific classification
- Kingdom: Animalia
- Phylum: Arthropoda
- Clade: Pancrustacea
- Class: Insecta
- Order: Coleoptera
- Suborder: Polyphaga
- Infraorder: Elateriformia
- Superfamily: Elateroidea
- Family: Lampyridae
- Subfamily: Lampyrinae
- Tribe: Lampyrini
- Genus: Lampyris; Geoffroy, 1762

Species
- Numerous, see text

= Lampyris =

Genus of beetles

Lampyris is a genus of beetles in the Lampyridae. In most of western Eurasia, they are the predominant members of this family and includes the European common glow-worm, which is the type species. They produce a continuous glow; the larvae and larviform females are among those organisms commonly called "glowworms".

This genus is rather close to Pleotomus and its relatives. These were formerly separated as tribe Pleotomini, but appear to be a specialized offshoot of the Lampyrini.

== Species ==
BioLib includes the following species:

- Lampyris algerica Ancey, 1869
- Lampyris ambigena Jacquelin du Val, 1860
- Lampyris angustula Fairmaire, 1895
- Lampyris brutia Costa, 1882
- Lampyris fuscata Geisthardt, 1987
- Lampyris germariensis Jacquelin du Val, 1860
- Lampyris hellenica Geisthardt, 1983
- Lampyris iberica Geisthardt, Figueira, Day & De Cock, 2008
- Lampyris lareynii Jacquelin du Val, 1859
- Lampyris monticola Geisthardt, 2000
- Lampyris noctiluca (Linnaeus, 1767) - type species (as Cantharis noctiluca L. 1767)
- Lampyris orientalis Faldermann, 1835
- Lampyris pallida Geisthardt, 1987
- Lampyris pseudozenkeri Geisthardt, 1999
- Lampyris raymondi Mulsant & Rey, 1859
- Lampyris sardiniae Geisthardt, 1987
- Lampyris zenkeri Germar, 1817
