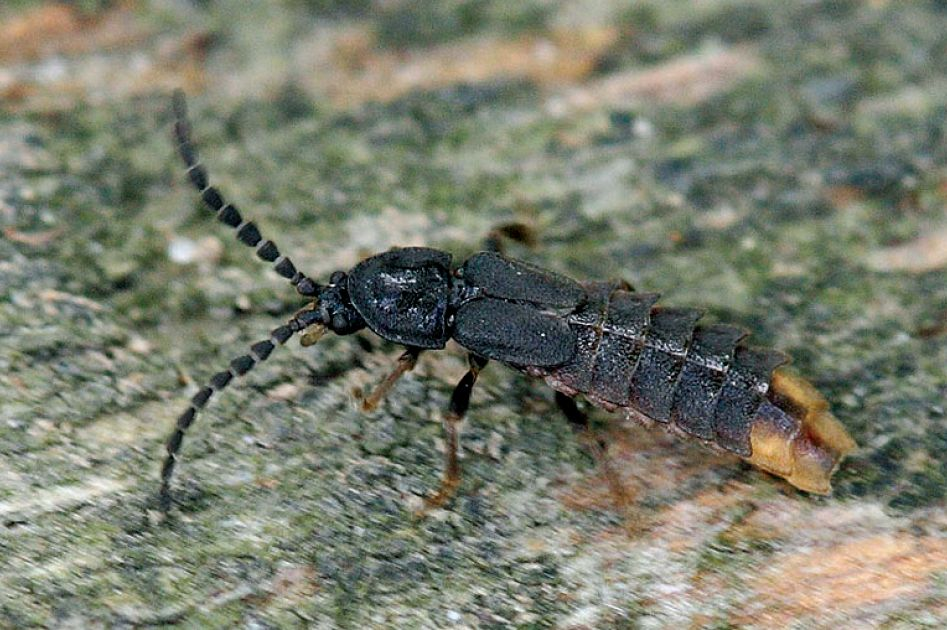

Scientific classification
- Kingdom: Animalia
- Phylum: Arthropoda
- Class: Insecta
- Order: Coleoptera
- Suborder: Polyphaga
- Infraorder: Elateriformia
- Family: Lampyridae
- Subfamily: Lampyrinae
- Tribe: Photinini
- Genus: Phosphaenus; Fourcroy, 1785
- Species: P. hemipterus

Binomial name
- Phosphaenus hemipterus (Geoffroy, 1762)

= Phosphaenus =

Species of beetle

Phosphaenus hemipterus, the short-winged firefly or lesser glow worm, is a beetle in the monotypic genus Phosphaenus and the family Lampyridae. It is found in the Mediterranean, in Central Europe, west to the Atlantic Ocean and north to the edge of Scandinavia and in England. In North America, the species has been introduced. It inhabits meadows, floodplains, forest edges, and dry slopes, but also parks and gardens. In Britain, this species is fairly rare compared to the common glow-worm (Lampyris noctiluca).

== Description ==
The beetles have a body length of 6–8 millimetres (0.24–0.31 in) (males) 10 mm (0.39 in) (females). The body is dark brown and has a reddish tinge. The females are neotenic. The males have greatly shortened wing covers and unlike other fireflies are similar to the female. Their membranous wings are reduced, which is why they resemble the flightless females.

The larvae are similar to females or to the larvae of Lampyris noctiluca, but they lack the bilateral series of pale dots on the abdomen, are slender in build and smaller. The light organ consists of a pair of light spots placed ventrally on the eighth abdominal segment.
