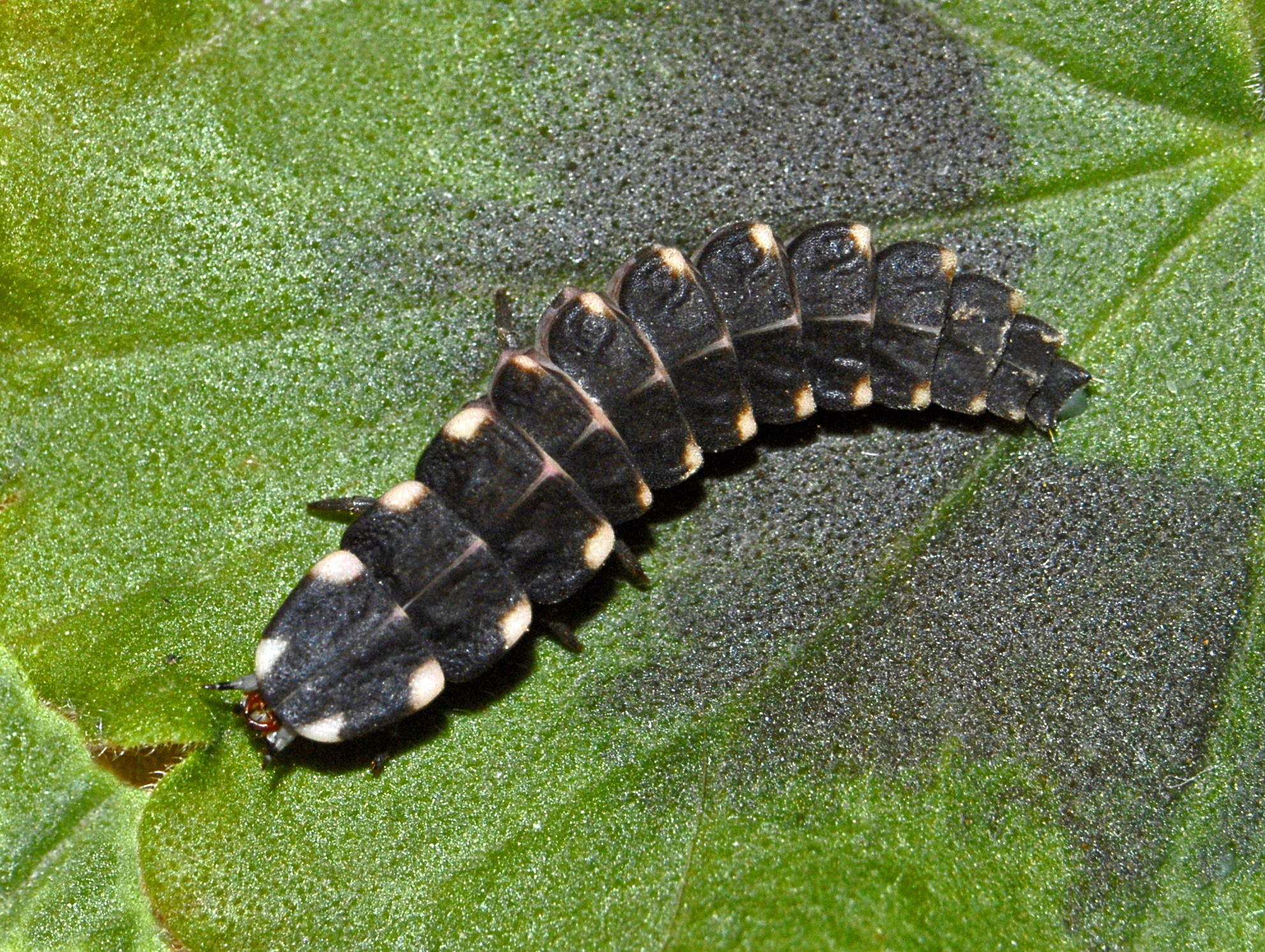
- Larva of Lampyris raymondi

Scientific classification
- Kingdom: Animalia
- Phylum: Arthropoda
- Class: Insecta
- Order: Coleoptera
- Suborder: Polyphaga
- Infraorder: Elateriformia
- Family: Lampyridae
- Genus: Lampyris
- Species: L. raymondi

Binomial name
- Lampyris raymondi Mulsant & Rey, 1859

Synonyms
- Lampyris lusitanica Motschulsky, 1854 nec Charpentier, 1825

= Lampyris raymondi =

Species of beetle

Lampyris raymondi is a firefly species of the genus Lampyris, belonging to the order Coleoptera.

== Description ==
Lampyris raymondi can reach an adult size of about 20 millimetres (0.79 in). This insect presents a conspicuous sexual dimorphism. The females generally are longer than males (up to 25mm in length). They are larviform, do not have wings and produce a continuous glow ("glowworms"). They use their bioluminescence to attract mates. The males are winged, elytra are brown, with a yellow border on the elytral suture. Pronotum is slightly more elongated. The abdomen is yellowish, with a very convex last dorsal segment.

The bodies of the larvae are composed of 12 bright black segments. They show two whitish or pale pink spots at the rear edge of each segment, with four spots on the first segment (corresponding to the pronotum). They can be easily distinguished from Lampyris noctiluca, which have just two spots on the first segment. In spring these predatory larvae can often be seen on paths in daylight.

== Distribution ==
This species can be found in Bulgaria, Portugal, south-east of France (Provence, Alps), Greece, Italy (Maritime Alps, west of the Apennines) and Spain, at an elevation up to 1,200 metres (3,900 ft).
