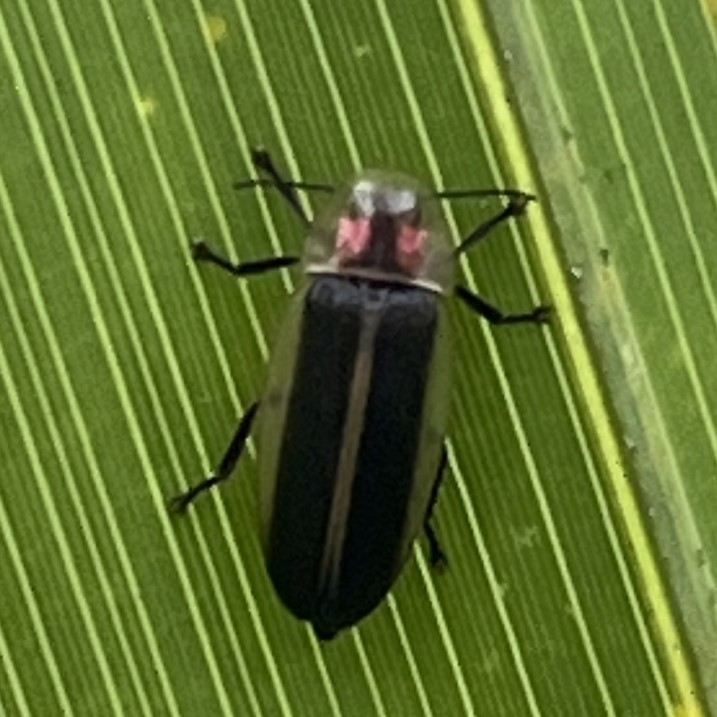

Conservation status
- Endangered (IUCN 3.1)

Scientific classification
- Kingdom: Animalia
- Phylum: Arthropoda
- Class: Insecta
- Order: Coleoptera
- Suborder: Polyphaga
- Infraorder: Elateriformia
- Family: Lampyridae
- Subfamily: Lampyrinae
- Tribe: Cratomorphini
- Genus: Micronaspis; Green, 1948
- Species: M. floridana

Binomial name
- Micronaspis floridana Green, 1948

= Micronaspis =

Micronaspis floridana

Species of firefly

Micronaspis is a genus of fireflies in the beetle family Lampyridae. It is monotypic, containing the single species, the Florida intertidal firefly (Micronaspis floridana).

== Distribution ==
It is found in the Bahamas and the southern United States (Florida).

== Threats ==
It is threatened by habitat loss from coastal development as well as storm surges and sea level rise as a consequence of climate change, with Hurricane Dorian having a major impact on Grand Bahama island, where the species is known from. Increased chemical and light pollution has also seriously affected the species. Further threatening it in Florida is the introduction of Steinernema carpocapsae as a biocontrol agent for crops, which is known to target other beetle species than the ones it is meant to control; it is likely the cause of a local extirpation of a population of M. floridana from Sarasota Bay.
