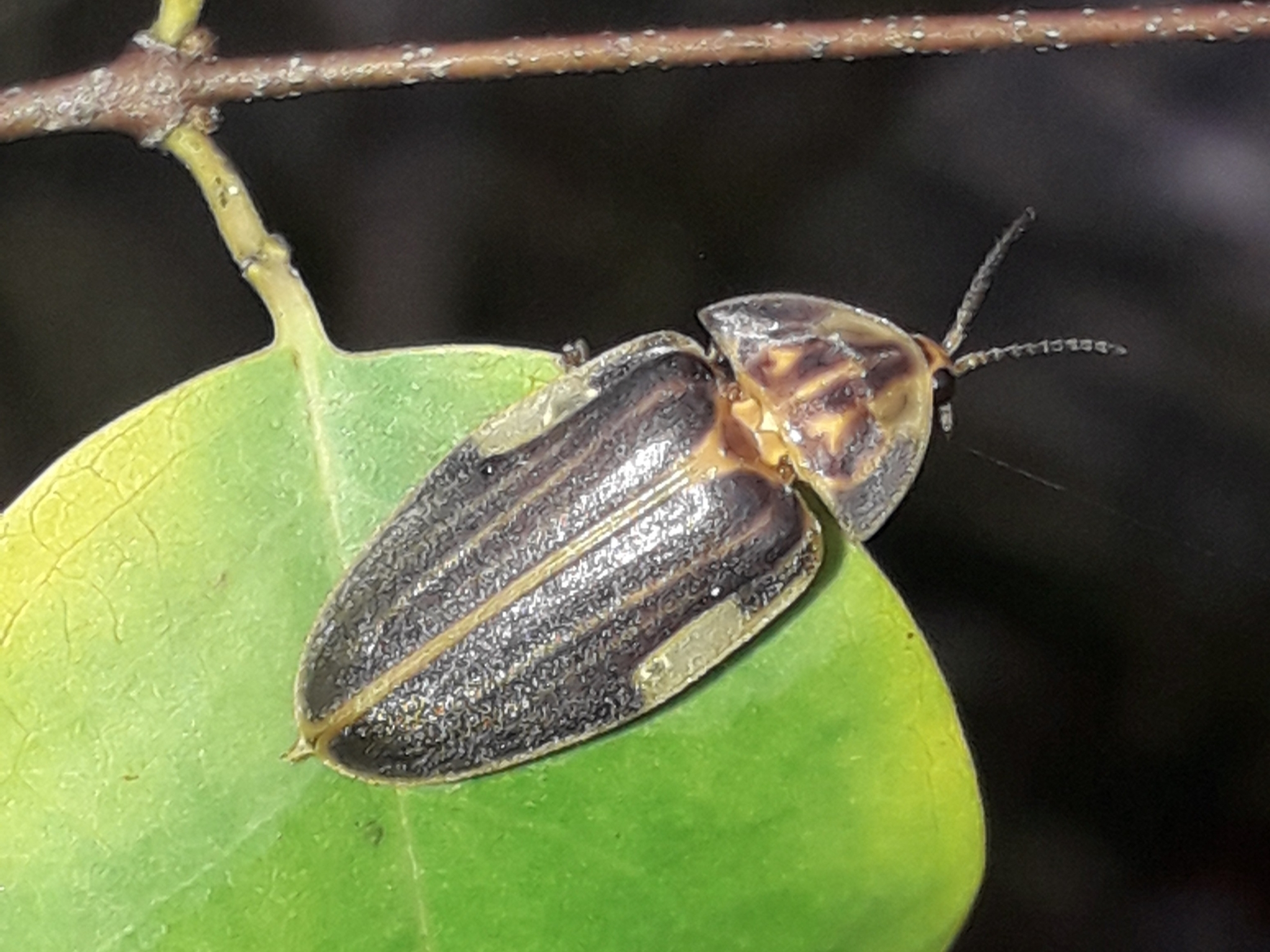

Conservation status
- Least Concern (IUCN 3.1)

Scientific classification
- Kingdom: Animalia
- Phylum: Arthropoda
- Clade: Pancrustacea
- Class: Insecta
- Order: Coleoptera
- Suborder: Polyphaga
- Infraorder: Elateriformia
- Family: Lampyridae
- Genus: Aspisoma
- Species: A. ignitum

Binomial name
- Aspisoma ignitum (Linnaeus, 1767)

= Aspisoma ignitum =

Species of beetle

Aspisoma ignitum is a species of firefly in the family Lampyridae. It is found in the Caribbean, Central America, North America, and South America. Its presence is uncertain in the United States.
