= Pyractomena linearis =

Conservation status
- Data Deficient (IUCN 3.1)

Scientific classification
- Kingdom: Animalia
- Phylum: Arthropoda
- Class: Insecta
- Order: Coleoptera
- Suborder: Polyphaga
- Infraorder: Elateriformia
- Family: Lampyridae
- Genus: Pyractomena
- Species: P. linearis

Binomial name
- Pyractomena linearis LeConte, 1852

Species of beetle

Pyractomena linearis is a species of firefly in the beetle family Lampyridae. It is found in North America.

It is found from the Midwest to the Atlantic Ocean, primarily along the border between the United States and Canada. It has a large range but has been documented very few times recently. It is a wetland specialist and is threatened by habitat destruction for housing and commercial areas, as well as light pollution.
