= Pyractomena dispersa =

Conservation status
- Data Deficient (IUCN 3.1)

Scientific classification
- Kingdom: Animalia
- Phylum: Arthropoda
- Class: Insecta
- Order: Coleoptera
- Suborder: Polyphaga
- Infraorder: Elateriformia
- Family: Lampyridae
- Genus: Pyractomena
- Species: P. dispersa

Binomial name
- Pyractomena dispersa Green, 1957

Species of beetle

Pyractomena dispersa is a species of firefly in the beetle family Lampyridae. It is found in North America.

It has a patchy distribution, with a range is divided into an eastern and western portion, with the Great Plains dividing both. It is found in wetland habitats. It is threatened by habitat destruction for residential and agricultural development, with light pollution also playing a role; however, more research is needed into the threats and how they affect the species.
