= Aspisoma physonotum =

Scientific classification
- Kingdom: Animalia
- Phylum: Arthropoda
- Clade: Pancrustacea
- Class: Insecta
- Order: Coleoptera
- Suborder: Polyphaga
- Infraorder: Elateriformia
- Family: Lampyridae
- Genus: Aspisoma
- Species: A. physonotum

Binomial name
- Aspisoma physonotum (Gorham, 1884)

Species of firefly

Aspisoma physonotum is a species of firefly from the genus Aspisoma. The species was originally described by Henry Stephen Gorham in 1884.

A. physontum are found predominantly in Brazil, as well as Colombia and Ecuador. They are pale green in colour.
