= Pyractomena marginalis =

Conservation status
- Data Deficient (IUCN 3.1)

Scientific classification
- Kingdom: Animalia
- Phylum: Arthropoda
- Class: Insecta
- Order: Coleoptera
- Suborder: Polyphaga
- Infraorder: Elateriformia
- Family: Lampyridae
- Genus: Pyractomena
- Species: P. marginalis

Binomial name
- Pyractomena marginalis Green, 1957

Species of beetle

Pyractomena marginalis is a species of firefly in the beetle family Lampyridae. It is found in North America.

It has a scattered distribution across the eastern United States. It was once known from eastern Texas north to southern Maine, but as of recently the only known active sites are in the Appalachian Mountains, indicating that may have been extirpated from parts of its former range. However, there is significant uncertainty about the current distribution of the species and it cannot be easily distinguished from other members of the genus, so no definitive statements can be made. It may be threatened by light pollution.
