= Microphotus dilatatus =

Conservation status
- Data Deficient (IUCN 3.1)

Scientific classification
- Kingdom: Animalia
- Phylum: Arthropoda
- Class: Insecta
- Order: Coleoptera
- Suborder: Polyphaga
- Infraorder: Elateriformia
- Family: Lampyridae
- Genus: Microphotus
- Species: M. dilatatus

Binomial name
- Microphotus dilatatus LeConte, 1866

Species of beetle

Microphotus dilatatus is a species of firefly in the beetle family Lampyridae. It is found in Central America and North America.
