= Microphotus angustus =

- The Californian pink glowworm

Scientific classification
- Kingdom: Animalia
- Phylum: Arthropoda
- Clade: Pancrustacea
- Class: Insecta
- Order: Coleoptera
- Suborder: Polyphaga
- Infraorder: Elateriformia
- Family: Lampyridae
- Genus: Microphotus
- Species: M. angustus

Binomial name
- Microphotus angustus LeConte, 1874

Species of beetle

Microphotus angustus is a species of firefly in the beetle family Lampyridae. It is found in North America.
