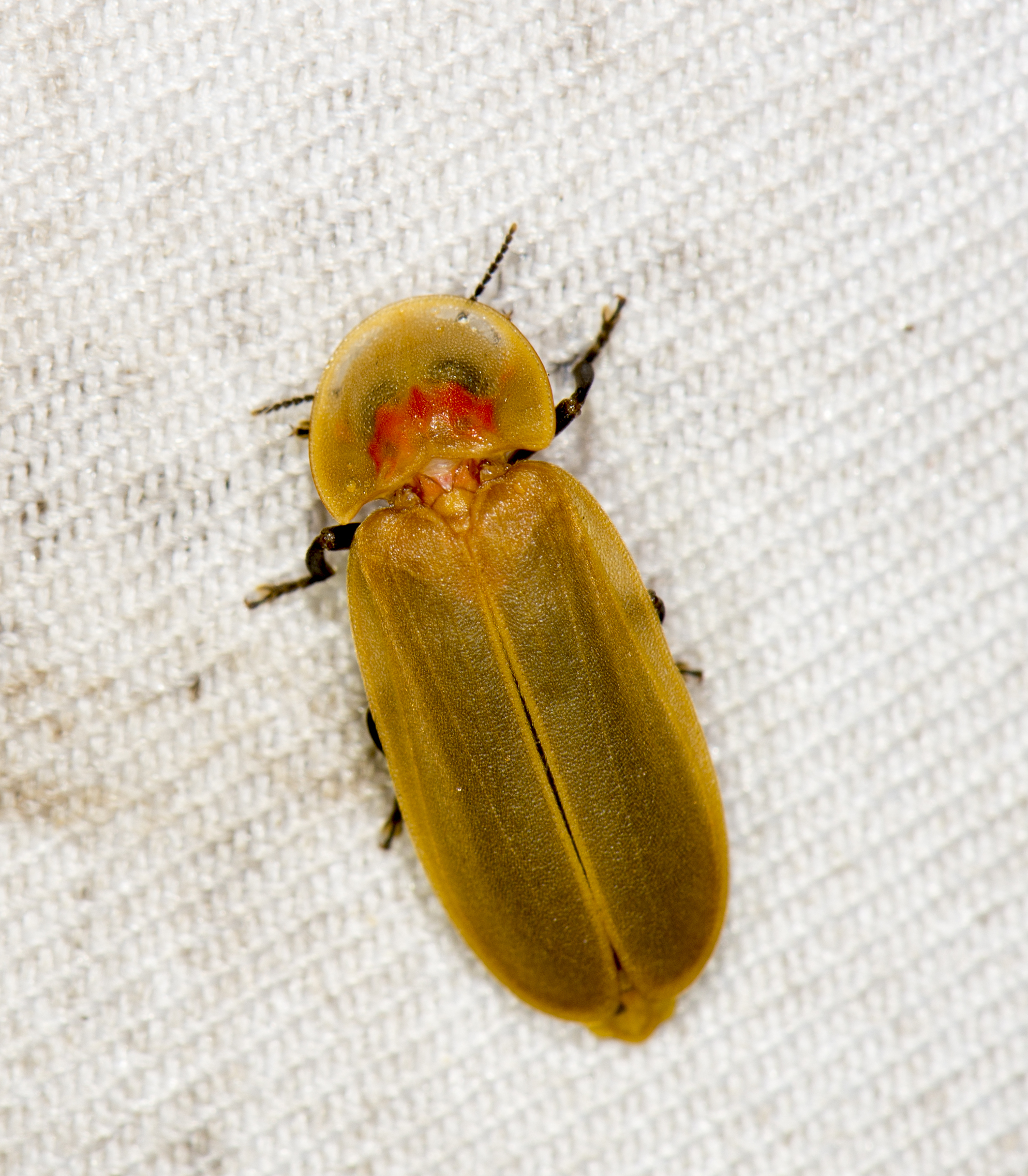
- Diaphanes citrinus

Scientific classification
- Kingdom: Animalia
- Phylum: Arthropoda
- Class: Insecta
- Order: Coleoptera
- Suborder: Polyphaga
- Infraorder: Elateriformia
- Family: Lampyridae
- Subfamily: Lampyrinae
- Genus: Diaphanes; Motschulsky, 1853

Type species
- Diaphanes luniger Motschulsky, 1853

Species
- See text

= Diaphanes (beetle) =

Genus of beetles

Diaphanes is a genus of fireflies in the Lampyrinae subfamily. The males have wings while the females are apterous. The males have an elongated clypeus. Both males and females have light-emitting organs.

Species in this genus include:

- Diaphanes abyssinus E. Olivier, 1911
- Diaphanes adustus Motschulsky, 1854
- Diaphanes alluaudi E. Olivier, 1914
- Diaphanes amplicollis Gerstaecker, 1871
- Diaphanes bilineaticollis Pic, 1952
- Diaphanes birmanensis E. Olivier, 1885
- Diaphanes brevicarinatus Pic, 1952
- Diaphanes bugnioni Bourgeois, 1909
- Diaphanes cheni Jeng in Jeng et al., 2001
- Diaphanes citrinus E. Olivier, 1911
- Diaphanes coomani Pic, 1929
- Diaphanes costulatus Kolbe, 1898
- Diaphanes diversipes Pic, 1952
- Diaphanes dorsalis E. Olivier, 1886
- Diaphanes elongatus Pic, 1927
- Diaphanes exsanguis E. Olivier, 1909
- Diaphanes fenetrellus Bourgeois, 1890
- Diaphanes flavilateralis Jeng and Yang in Jeng et al., 2001
- Diaphanes formosus E. Olivier, 1910
- Diaphanes fossicollis E. Olivier, 1908
- Diaphanes fraternus Kolbe, 1898
- Diaphanes fuscipennis Gorham, 1882
- Diaphanes giganteus Pic, 1952
- Diaphanes guttatus Gorham, 1880
- Diaphanes harmandi Pic, 1925
- Diaphanes huddi Gorham, 1880
- Diaphanes humeralis E. Olivier, 1885
- Diaphanes ictericus Gyllenhal in Schönherr, 1817
- Diaphanes indicus Motschulsky, 1854
- Diaphanes indutus E. Olivier, 1914
- Diaphanes innotaticollis Pic, 1952
- Diaphanes javanus Gorham, 1880
- Diaphanes jeanneli E. Olivier, 1914
- Diaphanes kilimanus Kolbe, 1898
- Diaphanes lampyroides E. Olivier, 1891
- Diaphanes lateapicalis Pic, 1935
- Diaphanes lateralis Pic, 1931
- Diaphanes latipennis Pic, 1931
- Diaphanes laurenti Pic, 1952
- Diaphanes leucopyga E. Olivier, 1886
- Diaphanes limbatus Gorham, 1880
- Diaphanes lineatus Pic, 1954
- Diaphanes longicarinatus Pic, 1955
- Diaphanes longicornis Blair, 1928
- Diaphanes longithorax Pic, 1935
- Diaphanes luniger Motschulsky, 1853
- Diaphanes lutescens Walker, 1858
- Diaphanes mammosus E. Olivier, 1900
- Diaphanes mareei Pic, 1952
- Diaphanes marginellus Hope in Gray, 1831
- Diaphanes mendax E. Olivier, 1891
- Diaphanes mendicanus Gorham, 1903
- Diaphanes meruanus Bourgeois, 1910
- Diaphanes messorius E. Olivier, 1914
- Diaphanes monticolus E. Olivier, 1914
- Diaphanes moultoni E. Olivier, 1909
- Diaphanes nigroreductus Pic, 1952
- Diaphanes nimbosus E. Olivier, 1909
- Diaphanes nitidior Pic, 1952
- Diaphanes nitidus Pic, 1931
- Diaphanes niveus Jeng and Satô in Jeng et al., 2001
- Diaphanes notaticollis E. Olivier, 1888
- Diaphanes nubilus Jeng and Lai in Jeng et al., 2001
- Diaphanes olivieri Gorham, 1895
- Diaphanes opacus Pic, 1952
- Diaphanes pallidior Pic, 1956
- Diaphanes pallidus Pic, 1938
- Diaphanes patruelis Bourgeois, 1890
- Diaphanes pectinealis Li & Liang, 2007
- Diaphanes pellucens E. Olivier, 1886
- Diaphanes pici McDermott, 1966
- Diaphanes picinus E. Olivier, 1906
- Diaphanes piligerus Kolbe, 1898
- Diaphanes plagiator E. Olivier, 1891
- Diaphanes planitianus Kolbe, 1898
- Diaphanes planus Gorham, 1895
- Diaphanes preapicalis Pic, 1958
- Diaphanes pygidialis Bourgeois, 1890
- Diaphanes raapi E. Olivier, 1897
- Diaphanes reductus Pic, 1931
- Diaphanes rhodesianus Pic, 1952
- Diaphanes rugicollis Fairmaire, 1887
- Diaphanes schoutedeni E. Olivier, 1914
- Diaphanes serotinus E. Olivier, 1907
- Diaphanes signaticollis Pic, 1950
- Diaphanes simulator E. Olivier, 1913
- Diaphanes sinuatus E. Olivier, 1908
- Diaphanes sjoestedti Bourgeois, 1910
- Diaphanes soyauxi Kolbe, 1883
- Diaphanes splichali E. Olivier, 1912
- Diaphanes strangulatus Pic, 1952
- Diaphanes subapicalis Pic, 1933
- Diaphanes subtestaceus Pic, 1952
- Diaphanes ugandanus Kolbe, 1898
- Diaphanes ultimus E. Olivier, 1909
- Diaphanes unimaculatus Pic, 1931
- Diaphanes uvaparanagama Wijekoon, 2024
- Diaphanes vaneyeni Pic, 1952
- Diaphanes varipes E. Olivier, 1914
