= Cratomorphini =

Scientific classification
- Kingdom: Animalia
- Phylum: Arthropoda
- Clade: Pancrustacea
- Class: Insecta
- Order: Coleoptera
- Suborder: Polyphaga
- Infraorder: Elateriformia
- Family: Lampyridae
- Subfamily: Lampyrinae
- Tribe: Cratomorphini; Green, 1948

Genera
- Several, see text

Tribe of beetles

The Cratomorphini are a tribe of fireflies within the large subfamily Lampyrinae. The genera placed in this tribe often contain well-sized members of their family. The larvae of many species climb trees to feed on snails. This group includes a few "lightning bugs" (flashing fireflies) from North America, such as the genus Pyractomena. Further south in the American tropics, Aspisoma can be found.

== Systematics ==
The group has recently been examined using molecular phylogenetics, using fairly comprehensive sampling.

== Genera ==
- Aspisoma Laporte, 1833
- Aspisomoides Zaragoza-Caballero, 1995
- Cassidomorphus Motschulsky, 1853
- Cratomorphus Motschulsky, 1853
- Micronaspis Green, 1948
- Paracratomorphus Zaragoza-Caballero, 2013
- Pyractomena LeConte, 1845
