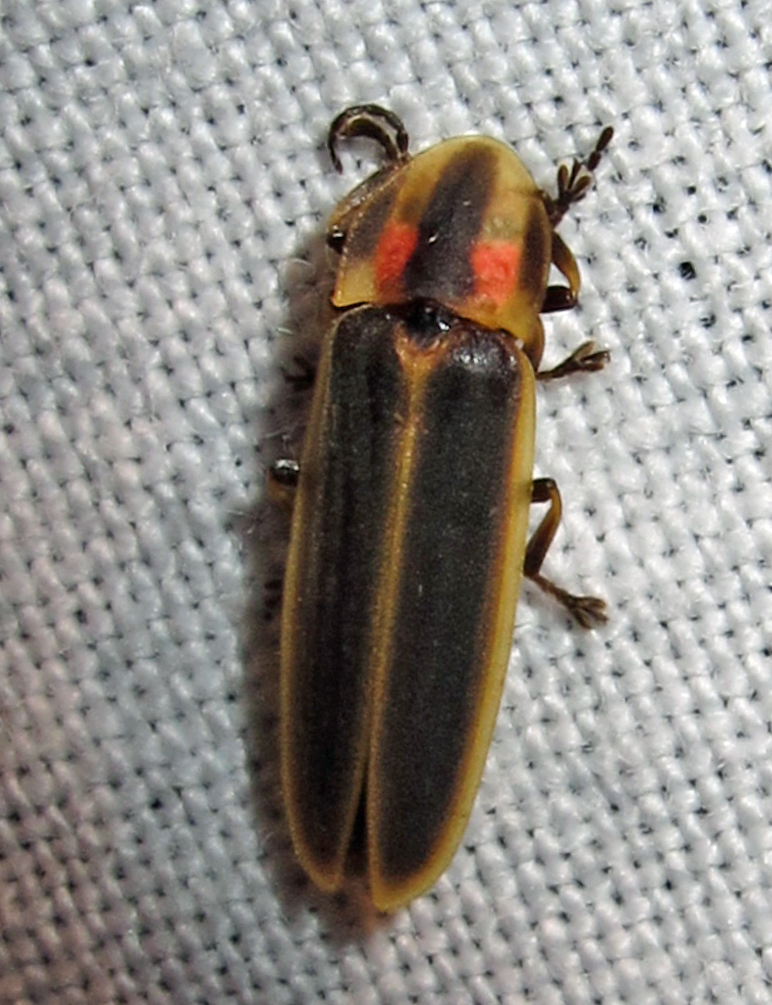

Conservation status
- Data Deficient (IUCN 3.1)

Scientific classification
- Kingdom: Animalia
- Phylum: Arthropoda
- Class: Insecta
- Order: Coleoptera
- Suborder: Polyphaga
- Infraorder: Elateriformia
- Family: Lampyridae
- Genus: Pyractomena
- Species: P. lucifera

Binomial name
- Pyractomena lucifera Melsheimer, 1845

= Pyractomena lucifera =

Species of beetle

Pyractomena lucifera is a species of firefly in the beetle family Lampyridae. It is found in North America.

Its range is divided into two subpopulations; one from the Great Lakes region east to New York and south to Maryland, and the other from North Carolina south to Florida and west to Texas and Oklahoma. It is a wetland specialist and is threatened by habitat destruction for housing and commercial areas, as well as light pollution.
