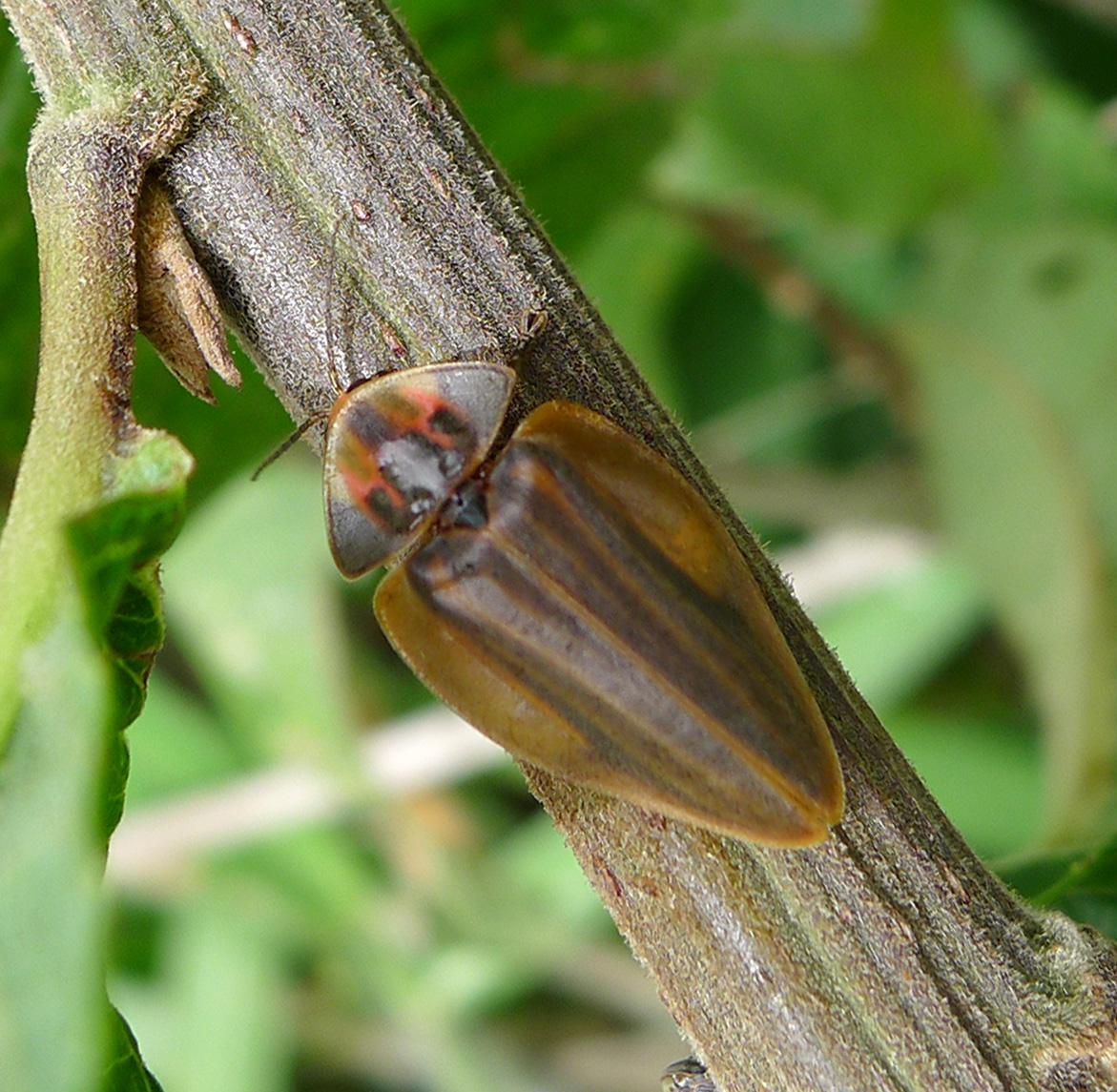

Scientific classification
- Domain: Eukaryota
- Kingdom: Animalia
- Phylum: Arthropoda
- Class: Insecta
- Order: Coleoptera
- Suborder: Polyphaga
- Infraorder: Elateriformia
- Family: Lampyridae
- Tribe: Cratomorphini
- Genus: Aspisoma; Laporte, 1833

= Aspisoma =

Genus of beetles

Aspisoma is a genus of fireflies in the family Lampyridae. There are at least 70 described species in Aspisoma.

== Species ==
These 71 species belong to the genus Aspisoma:

- Aspisoma aegrotum (Gorham, 1880)
- Aspisoma aelianum (Gorham, 1884)
- Aspisoma angustum Kirsch, 1873
- Aspisoma argutum Berg, 1885
- Aspisoma binotatum Kirsch, 1865
- Aspisoma bisignatum (Motschulsky, 1854)
- Aspisoma blanchardi Kirsch, 1865
- Aspisoma bohlsi E. Olivier, 1896
- Aspisoma boliviensis Pic, 1934
- Aspisoma bremeri (Motschulsky, 1854)
- Aspisoma brevicolle Kirsch, 1865
- Aspisoma buyssoni (E. Olivier, 1888)
- Aspisoma candellarium Reiche, 1843
- Aspisoma cassideum (Motschulsky, 1854)
- Aspisoma claveri Pic, 1917
- Aspisoma concoloripenne (Blanchard in Brullé, 1846)
- Aspisoma diaphanum (Gorham, 1880)
- Aspisoma dilatatum Laporte, 1840
- Aspisoma diversicolle Pic, 1917
- Aspisoma elongatum Pic, 1934
- Aspisoma fenestratum (Blanchard in Brullé, 1846)
- Aspisoma forticornis Pic, 1917
- Aspisoma fusicornis E. Olivier, 1885
- Aspisoma gentile E. Olivier in Wytsman, 1907
- Aspisoma grossum Erichson, 1847
- Aspisoma guyanense Pic, 1917
- Aspisoma hesperum (Linnaeus, 1767)
- Aspisoma holtzi Pic, 1934
- Aspisoma ignitum (Linnaeus, 1767)
- Aspisoma impressipenne (Motschulsky, 1854)
- Aspisoma inangulatum Pic, 1934
- Aspisoma inhumeralis Pic, 1917
- Aspisoma insperatum E. Olivier, 1912
- Aspisoma laetum Berg, 1885
- Aspisoma laterale (Fabricius, 1801)
- Aspisoma lepidum (Gorham, 1881)
- Aspisoma limbatum Gemminger, 1870
- Aspisoma lineatum (Gyllenhal in Schönherr, 1817)
- Aspisoma lineolatum (Motschulsky, 1854)
- Aspisoma luridum E. Olivier in Wytsman, 1907
- Aspisoma maculatum (De Geer, 1774)
- Aspisoma mendesense Pic, 1917
- Aspisoma minutum Pic, 1917
- Aspisoma neglectum E. Olivier, 1896
- Aspisoma nigrum E. Olivier, 1907
- Aspisoma nitens (De Geer, 1774)
- Aspisoma nitidum (Motschulsky, 1854)
- Aspisoma ovale Blanchard in Brullé, 1846
- Aspisoma pallens (E. Olivier, 1888)
- Aspisoma palliatum (Motschulsky, 1854)
- Aspisoma pallidum (G. Olivier, 1790)
- Aspisoma pellucidum (Motschulsky, 1854)
- Aspisoma perixanthum E. Olivier in Wytsman, 1907
- Aspisoma perplexum (E. Olivier, 1888)
- Aspisoma physonotum (Gorham, 1884)
- Aspisoma pulchellum (Gorham, 1880)
- Aspisoma quasidiaphanum Zaragoza, 1995
- Aspisoma roseiventer (E. Olivier, 1885)
- Aspisoma rotundum E. Olivier, 1885
- Aspisoma rufimembris Pic, 1932
- Aspisoma rufipenne Pic, 1917
- Aspisoma sexpunctatum (Motschulsky, 1854)
- Aspisoma signiferum (Eschscholtz, 1822)
- Aspisoma sinuaticolle Kirsch, 1873
- Aspisoma sticticum (Gemminger, 1870)
- Aspisoma subelongatum Pic, 1932
- Aspisoma superciliosum Gorham, 1898
- Aspisoma trilineata (Say, 1835)
- Aspisoma vittulum (Motschulsky, 1854)
- Aspisoma yechae McDermott, 1966
- Aspisoma yucatanum E. Olivier, 1908
