= Microphotus decarthrus =

Scientific classification
- Domain: Eukaryota
- Kingdom: Animalia
- Phylum: Arthropoda
- Class: Insecta
- Order: Coleoptera
- Suborder: Polyphaga
- Infraorder: Elateriformia
- Family: Lampyridae
- Genus: Microphotus
- Species: M. decarthrus

Binomial name
- Microphotus decarthrus Fall, 1912

Species of beetle

Microphotus decarthrus is a species of firefly in the family Lampyridae. It is found in North America.
