= Paraphausis =

Scientific classification
- Kingdom: Animalia
- Phylum: Arthropoda
- Class: Insecta
- Order: Coleoptera
- Suborder: Polyphaga
- Infraorder: Elateriformia
- Family: Lampyridae
- Tribe: Lampyrini
- Genus: Paraphausis; Green, 1948
- Species: P. eximius

Binomial name
- Paraphausis eximius Green, 1948

Genus of beetles

Paraphausis is a genus of fireflies in the family of beetles known as Lampyridae, containing a single described species, Paraphausis eximius.
