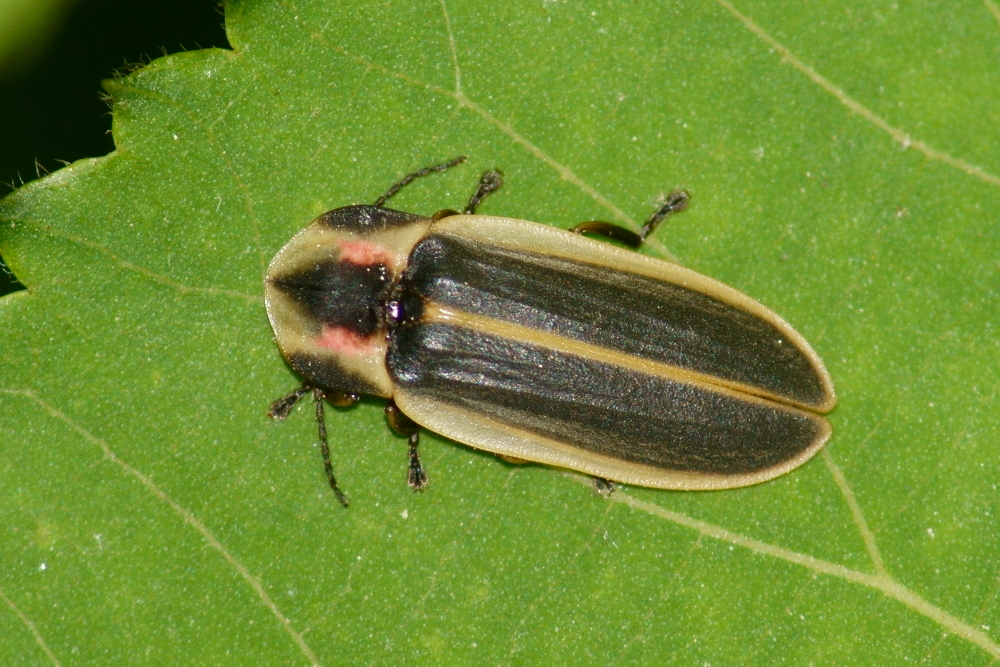

Conservation status
- Least Concern (IUCN 3.1)

Scientific classification
- Kingdom: Animalia
- Phylum: Arthropoda
- Clade: Pancrustacea
- Class: Insecta
- Order: Coleoptera
- Suborder: Polyphaga
- Infraorder: Elateriformia
- Family: Lampyridae
- Genus: Pyractomena
- Species: P. angulata

Binomial name
- Pyractomena angulata (Say, 1825)

= Pyractomena angulata =

Species of beetle

Pyractomena angulata is a species of firefly in the family of beetles known as Lampyridae. It is found in North America and is the state insect of Indiana. It is also known as Say's firefly named after Thomas Say, and the angle candled firefly.

Like most species of the genus Pyractomena, it has an amber/orange-colored bioluminescence. It inhabits woodlands and is visible between May and mid-July.
