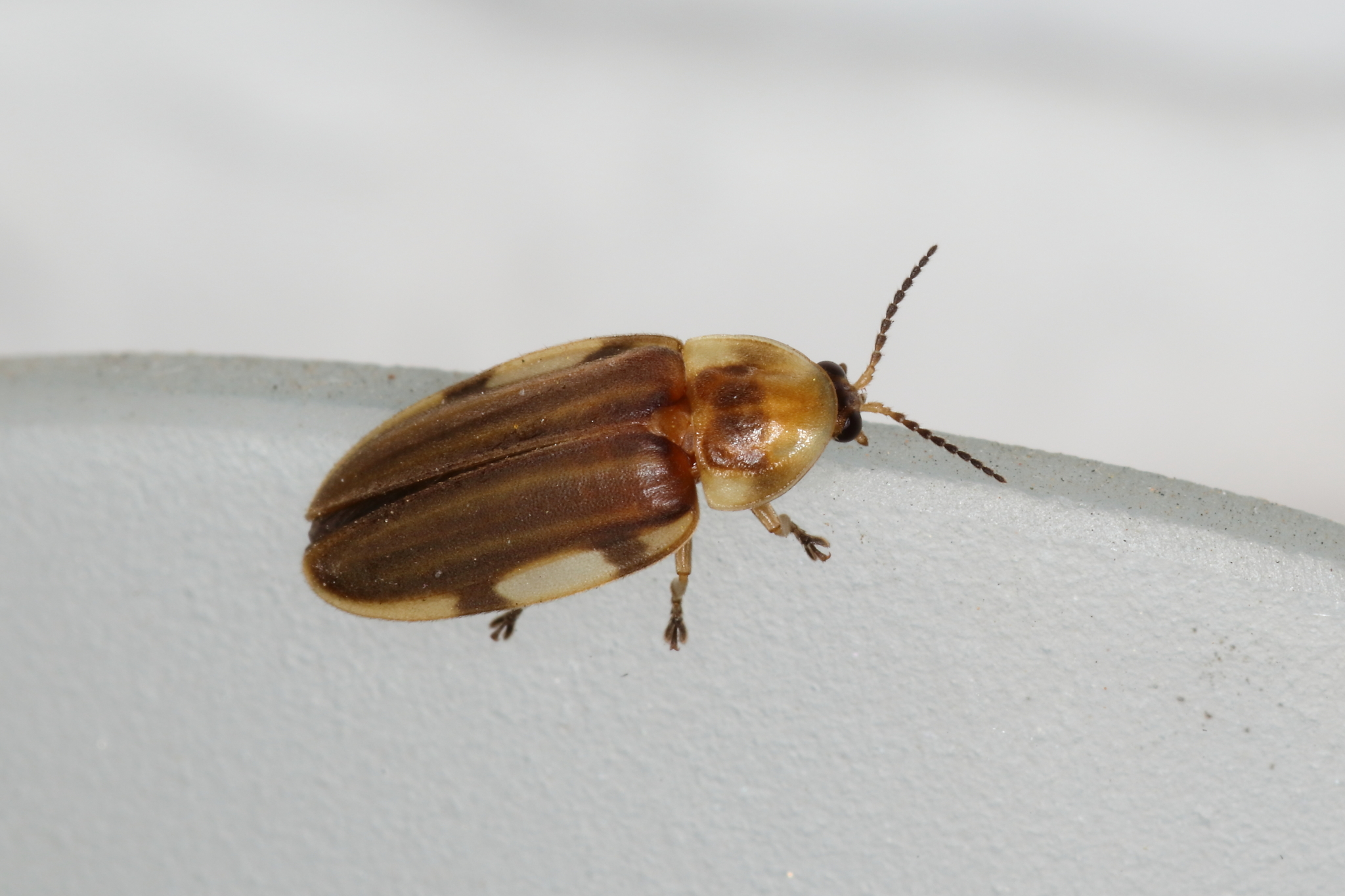

Scientific classification
- Kingdom: Animalia
- Phylum: Arthropoda
- Class: Insecta
- Order: Coleoptera
- Suborder: Polyphaga
- Infraorder: Elateriformia
- Family: Lampyridae
- Genus: Aspisoma
- Species: A. lineatum

Binomial name
- Aspisoma lineatum (Gyllenhal, 1817)

= Aspisoma lineatum =

Species of firefly

Aspisoma lineatum is a species of firefly found in Brazil's southeast region.

Aspisoma lineatum flashes at intervals of around two seconds.
