= Microphotus fragilis =

Scientific classification
- Domain: Eukaryota
- Kingdom: Animalia
- Phylum: Arthropoda
- Class: Insecta
- Order: Coleoptera
- Suborder: Polyphaga
- Infraorder: Elateriformia
- Family: Lampyridae
- Genus: Microphotus
- Species: M. fragilis

Binomial name
- Microphotus fragilis E. Olivier, 1912

Species of beetle

Microphotus fragilis is a species of firefly in the family of beetles known as Lampyridae. It is found in North America. They tend to be more easily found in desert landscapes. This species of firefly is known for its huge eyes that are accompanied by a strongly convex pronotum.
