= Lampyris algerica =

Scientific classification
- Domain: Eukaryota
- Kingdom: Animalia
- Phylum: Arthropoda
- Class: Insecta
- Order: Coleoptera
- Suborder: Polyphaga
- Infraorder: Elateriformia
- Family: Lampyridae
- Genus: Lampyris
- Species: L. algerica

Binomial name
- Lampyris algerica Ancey 1869

Species of beetle

Lampyris algerica is a species of firefly in the genus Lampyris. It lives in Algeria and is commonly known as a glowworm, although this name is not specific to the species.
