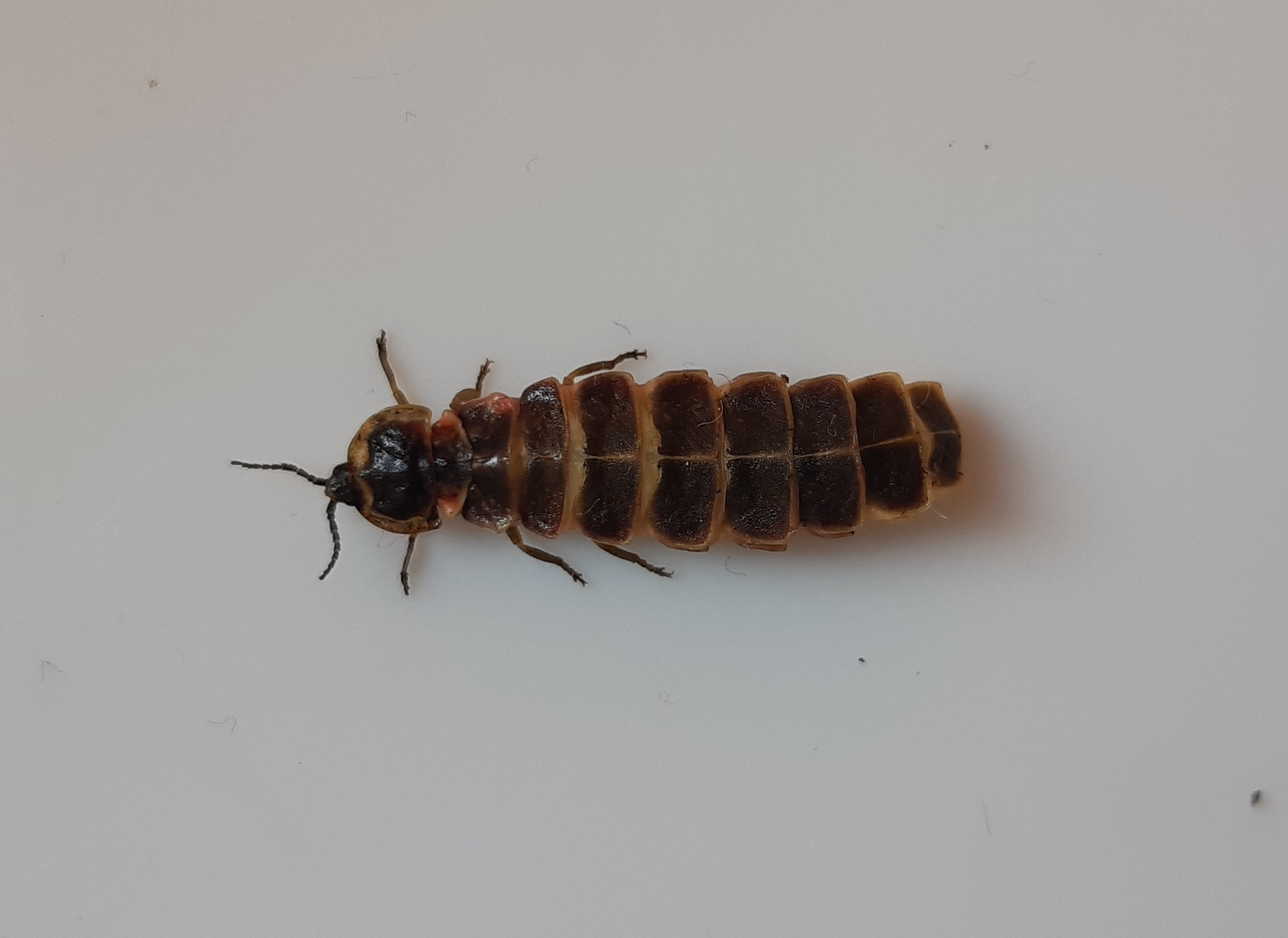
- Lampyris iberica female

Scientific classification
- Kingdom: Animalia
- Phylum: Arthropoda
- Class: Insecta
- Order: Coleoptera
- Suborder: Polyphaga
- Infraorder: Elateriformia
- Family: Lampyridae
- Genus: Lampyris
- Species: L. iberica

Binomial name
- Lampyris iberica Geisthardt, Figueira, Day & De Cock, 2008

= Lampyris iberica =

Species of firefly

Lampyris iberica, the Iberian firefly, is a species of firefly. The species is endemic of the Iberian Peninsula and Southern France.
