= Pyractomena punctiventris =

Conservation status
- Least Concern (IUCN 3.1)

Scientific classification
- Kingdom: Animalia
- Phylum: Arthropoda
- Class: Insecta
- Order: Coleoptera
- Suborder: Polyphaga
- Infraorder: Elateriformia
- Family: Lampyridae
- Genus: Pyractomena
- Species: P. punctiventris

Binomial name
- Pyractomena punctiventris LeConte, 1878

Species of beetle

Pyractomena punctiventris is a species in the family Lampyridae (fireflies), in the order Coleoptera (beetles). It is found in North America, where it is known from east-central Texas south to Veracruz, Mexico.
