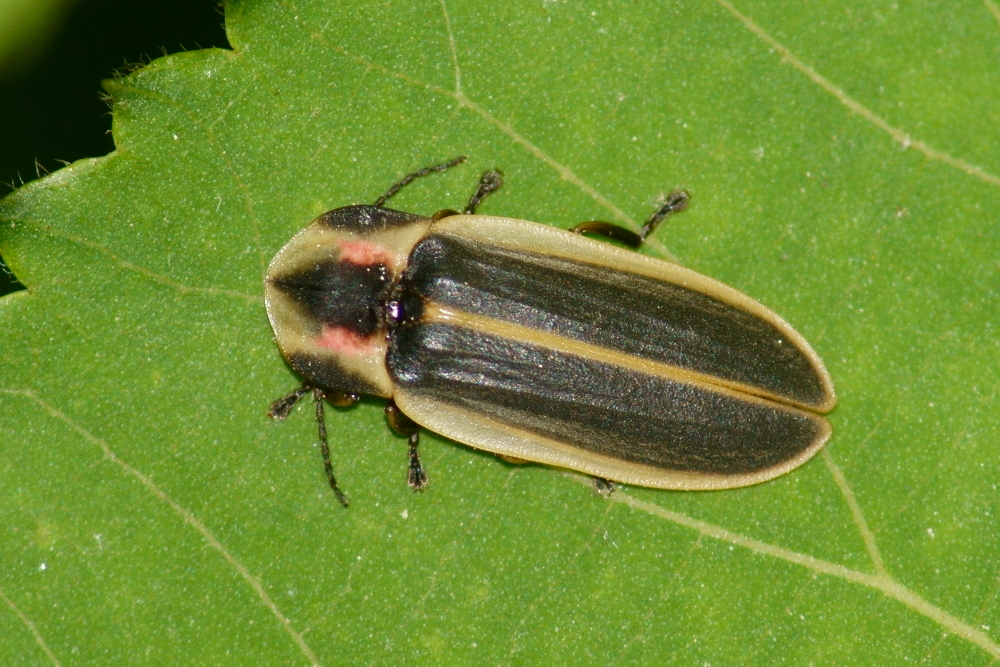
- Pyractomena angulata

Scientific classification
- Kingdom: Animalia
- Phylum: Arthropoda
- Clade: Pancrustacea
- Class: Insecta
- Order: Coleoptera
- Suborder: Polyphaga
- Infraorder: Elateriformia
- Family: Lampyridae
- Tribe: Cratomorphini
- Genus: Pyractomena; LeConte, 1845

= Pyractomena =

Genus of beetles

Pyractomena is a genus of fireflies in the family Lampyridae. There are at least 20 described species in Pyractomena.

== Species ==
- Pyractomena angulata Say, 1825 – Say's firefly, candle firefly
- Pyractomena angustata LeConte, 1851
- Pyractomena barberi Green, 1957
- Pyractomena borealis Randall, 1828 – spring treetop flasher)
- Pyractomena discoidea Gorham, 1884
- Pyractomena dispersa Green, 1957 – marsh flicker
- Pyractomena dorsalis Motschulsky, 1854
- Pyractomena ecostata LeConte, 1878
- Pyractomena floridana Green, 1957
- Pyractomena galeata E. Olivier, 1899
- Pyractomena gamma Jacquelin Du Val in Sagra, 1857
- Pyractomena gorhami McDermott, 1966
- Pyractomena heterodoxa Leng and Mutchler, 1922
- Pyractomena limbicollis Green, 1957
- Pyractomena linearis LeConte, 1852 – marsh gray
- Pyractomena lucifera Melsheimer, 1845 – marsh imp
- Pyractomena marginalis Green, 1957 – marginal firefly
- Pyractomena palustris Green, 1957 – marsh diver
- Pyractomena punctiventris LeConte, 1878
- Pyractomena similis Green, 1957
- Pyractomena sinuata Green, 1957
- Pyractomena striatella Gorham, 1880
- Pyractomena vexillaria Gorham, 1881
- Pyractomena vitticollis Motschulsky, 1853
- Pyractomena watsoni Leng and Mutchler, 1922
