= Pyractomena ecostata =

Conservation status
- Endangered (IUCN 3.1)

Scientific classification
- Kingdom: Animalia
- Phylum: Arthropoda
- Class: Insecta
- Order: Coleoptera
- Suborder: Polyphaga
- Infraorder: Elateriformia
- Family: Lampyridae
- Genus: Pyractomena
- Species: P. ecostata

Binomial name
- Pyractomena ecostata (LeConte, 1878)

Species of beetle

Pyractomena ecostata, the keel-necked firefly, is an endangered species of firefly in the beetle family Lampyridae.

It is endemic to the United States, where it has a disjunct distribution of two widely geographically separate regions; one in coastal regions around the Mobile Bay region of Alabama and east through most of peninsular Florida, and the other in saltmarshes surrounding Delaware Bay and Cape May in the states of Delaware and New Jersey. This distribution is likely real and not just a consequence of selective sampling, as it is a distinctive species and would be easily detected. P. ecostata may be a relict species with its distribution being a consequence of marine transgression following the end of the Last Glacial Maximum; prior to this, it may have had a much wider distribution along the Atlantic coast until sea level rise reduced its range to just two regions.

It is found in brackish habitats, especially those that receive some saltwater intrusion, including black needlerush (Juncus roemerianus) marshland in Florida and the margins of coastal meadows in New Jersey; however, it has also been detected in wet pastures along highways in Florida, so saltwater intrusion is not necessary for its survival.

The species is endangered due to many factors. Unsustainable coastal development has destroyed many of the saltmarsh habitats it needs in Florida. Sea level rise may completely wipe out the habitats it relies on if global temperatures rise to more than 4 °C of pre-industrial concentrations. In addition, the invasion of wetlands by common reed (Phragmites australis) and light pollution may also be significant threats.
