= Pleotomus nigripennis =

Scientific classification
- Kingdom: Animalia
- Phylum: Arthropoda
- Class: Insecta
- Order: Coleoptera
- Suborder: Polyphaga
- Infraorder: Elateriformia
- Family: Lampyridae
- Genus: Pleotomus
- Species: P. nigripennis

Binomial name
- Pleotomus nigripennis LeConte, 1885

Species of beetle

Pleotomus nigripennis is a species of firefly in the family Lampyridae. It is found in North America.
