= Microphotus octarthrus =

Scientific classification
- Domain: Eukaryota
- Kingdom: Animalia
- Phylum: Arthropoda
- Class: Insecta
- Order: Coleoptera
- Suborder: Polyphaga
- Infraorder: Elateriformia
- Family: Lampyridae
- Genus: Microphotus
- Species: M. octarthrus

Binomial name
- Microphotus octarthrus Fall, 1912

Species of beetle

Microphotus octarthrus, the desert firefly, is a species of firefly in the beetle family Lampyridae. It is found in North America.
