= Microphotus =

Scientific classification
- Kingdom: Animalia
- Phylum: Arthropoda
- Clade: Pancrustacea
- Class: Insecta
- Order: Coleoptera
- Suborder: Polyphaga
- Infraorder: Elateriformia
- Family: Lampyridae
- Tribe: Lampyrini
- Genus: Microphotus; LeConte, 1866

Genus of beetles

Microphotus is a genus of fireflies in the family Lampyridae. Microphotus are usually found in the southwestern region of the United States of America and adjoining parts of Mexico. There are seven described species in Microphotus in the United States and three more in Mexico.

== Species ==
- Microphotus angustus LeConte, 1874
- Microphotus chiricahuae Green, 1959
- Microphotus curvophallus Zaragoza-Caballero, Vega-Badillo & Cifuentes-Ruiz, 2021
- Microphotus decarthrus Fall, 1912
- Microphotus dilatatus LeConte, 1866
- Microphotus fragilis E. Olivier, 1912
- Microphotus morronei Zaragoza-Caballero, López-Pérez & Rodríguez-Mirón, 2021
- Microphotus octarthrus Fall, 1912 (desert firefly)
- Microphotus pecosensis Fall, 1912
- Microphotus robustophallus Zaragoza-Caballero, Domínguez-León & González-Ramírez, 2021
