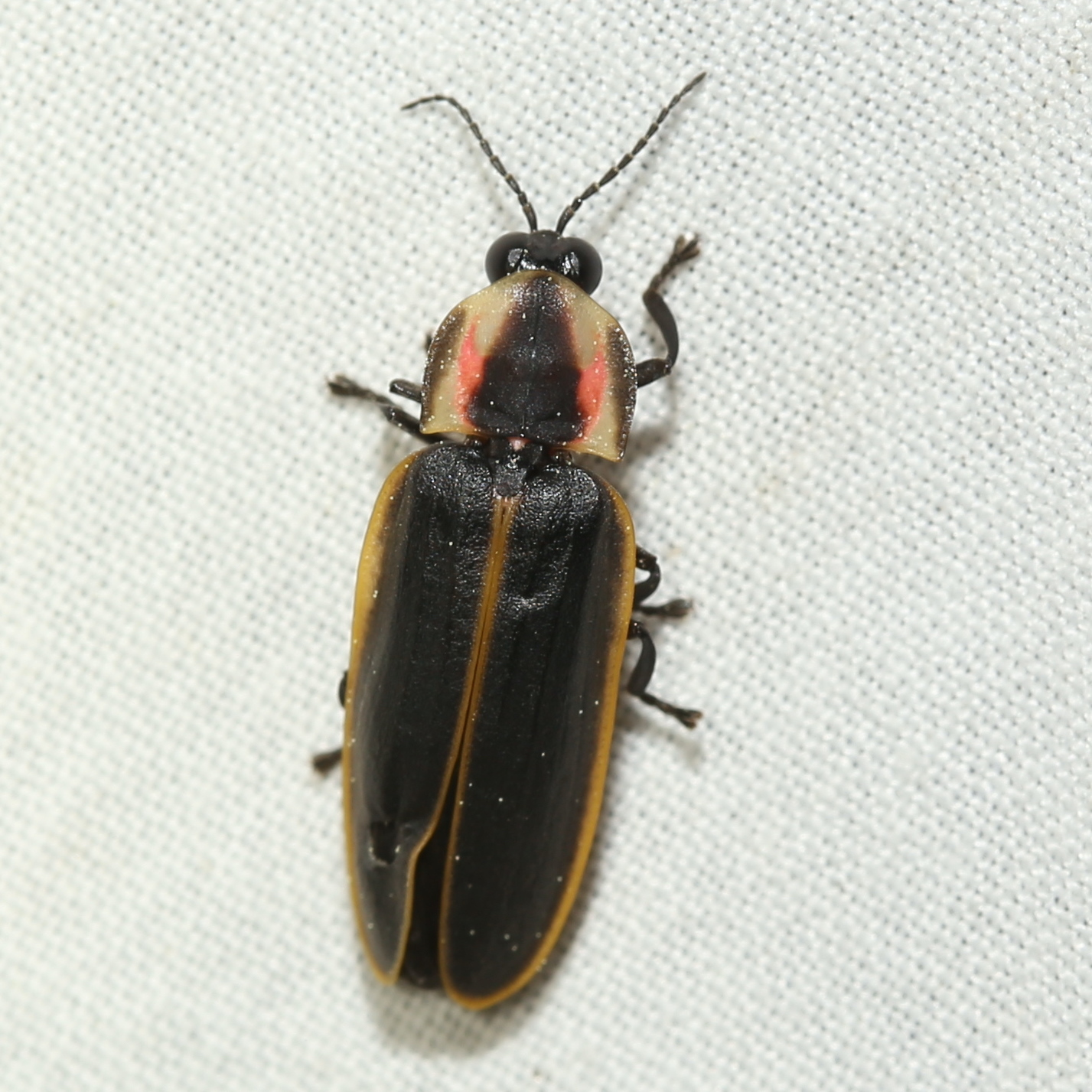

Conservation status
- Least Concern (IUCN 3.1)

Scientific classification
- Kingdom: Animalia
- Phylum: Arthropoda
- Clade: Pancrustacea
- Class: Insecta
- Order: Coleoptera
- Suborder: Polyphaga
- Infraorder: Elateriformia
- Family: Lampyridae
- Genus: Pyractomena
- Species: P. borealis

Binomial name
- Pyractomena borealis (Randall, 1828)

= Pyractomena borealis =

Species of beetle

Pyractomena borealis commonly known as the Spring tree-top flasher is a species of firefly in the beetle family Lampyridae. It is found in North America, where it has a very wide distribution, as it is known from Alberta east to the Maritime Provinces of Canada, and south to all US states east of the Mississippi River.
