= Prolutacea =

Scientific classification
- Kingdom: Animalia
- Phylum: Arthropoda
- Class: Insecta
- Order: Coleoptera
- Suborder: Polyphaga
- Infraorder: Elateriformia
- Family: Lampyridae
- Tribe: Lampyrini
- Genus: Prolutacea; Cicero, 2006
- Species: P. pulsator

Binomial name
- Prolutacea pulsator Cicero, 2006

Genus of beetles

Prolutacea is a genus of fireflies in the family of beetles known as Lampyridae, containing a single described species, Prolutacea pulsator.
