= Pyractomena vexillaria =

Scientific classification
- Domain: Eukaryota
- Kingdom: Animalia
- Phylum: Arthropoda
- Class: Insecta
- Order: Coleoptera
- Suborder: Polyphaga
- Infraorder: Elateriformia
- Family: Lampyridae
- Genus: Pyractomena
- Species: P. vexillaria

Binomial name
- Pyractomena vexillaria Gorham, 1881

Species of beetle

Pyractomena vexillaria is a species of firefly in the beetle family Lampyridae. It is found in Central America and North America.
