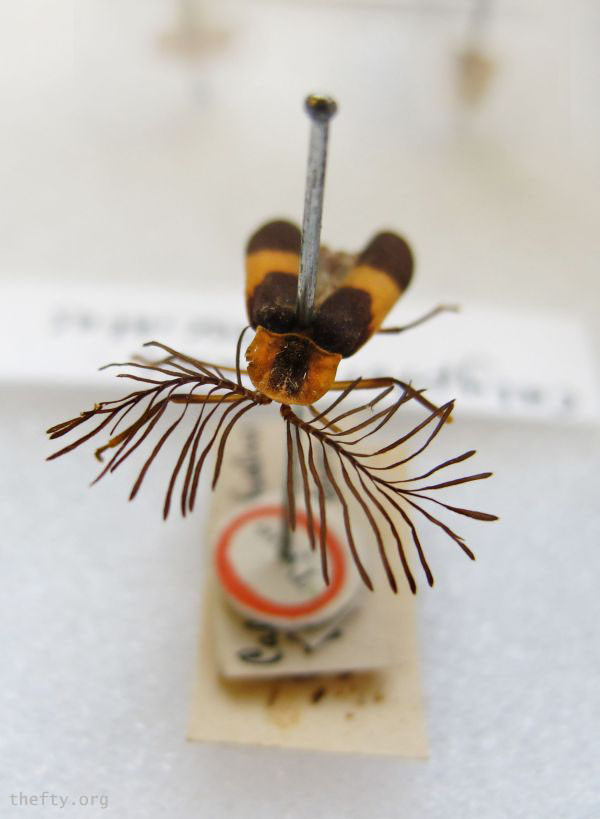
- Calyptocephalus fasciatus

Scientific classification
- Kingdom: Animalia
- Phylum: Arthropoda
- Clade: Pancrustacea
- Class: Insecta
- Order: Coleoptera
- Suborder: Polyphaga
- Infraorder: Elateriformia
- Family: Lampyridae
- Subfamily: Lampyrinae
- Tribe: Pleotomini

= Pleotomini =

Tribe of beetles

The Pleotomini are a tribe of fireflies in the large subfamily Lampyrinae.

== Systematics ==
The group has recently been examined using molecular phylogenetics, using fairly comprehensive sampling.

== Genera ==
- Calyptocephalus Gray, 1832
- Ophoelis Olivier, 1911
- Phaenolis Gorham, 1880
- Pleotomodes Green, 1948
- Pleotomus LeConte, 1881
- Roleta McDermott, 1962
