= Pyrocoelia pectoralis =

Scientific classification
- Kingdom: Animalia
- Phylum: Arthropoda
- Class: Insecta
- Order: Coleoptera
- Suborder: Polyphaga
- Infraorder: Elateriformia
- Family: Lampyridae
- Genus: Pyrocoelia
- Species: P. pectoralis

Binomial name
- Pyrocoelia pectoralis (E.Olivier, 1883)

Species of firefly

Pyrocoelia pectoralis is a species of firefly in the family Lampyridae, found in southeast Asia.

== Description and physical characteristics ==
Pyrocoelia pectoralis bears five distinct forms as eggs, larvae, pupae, and adult males and females. Larval forms appear charcoal black with cream to pale red patterning up their undersides as well as on the top back corners of their head, thoracic segments, and abdominal segments. Additionally the legs and pygopodium have cream colored bands. The segments of the larvae are relatively flat. These segments are widest just behind the head and most narrow near the pygopodium. Larvae curl into a hook-like shape before pupation, which is maintained until emergence. Fireflies in prepupation are very similar to their larval form, but may appear bloated and stop moving as they begin pupating. While male and female pupae do begin to differentiate themselves inside their puparia, their adult forms are much more apparently contrasted. Female adults do not fly, and largely resemble their larval form, with the additions of more rounded abdomen, weak wings, and lighter coloration. The male adults are starkly different compared to every other stage of the species, as they are the only form that flies. Male adults are perhaps the most recognizable as a firefly, with red-orange heads, black-backed elytra, and lightly colored lower abdomen in addition to the characteristic bioluminescent glow all stages of the species produce. Male adults are also smaller than their female counterparts as well as their larval forms. Pyrocoelia pectoralis have the ability to glow from the larval stage through death, and have a fairly typical peak emitted wavelength averaging just under 550 nm, a vibrant yellow-green.

== Habitat and range ==
Pyrocoelia pectoralis inhabits moist, shaded environments within mainland China such as farmlands, grasslands, and jungles near rivers and streams - where prey such as snails and other small invertebrates are abundant for larvae. These habitats feature rich terrestrial vegetation, high humidity and low light pollution - factors critical for survival, reproductive behavior, and bioluminescent signaling. Like other firefly species, larvae of Pyrocoelia pectoralis live in enclosed, damp areas such as leaf litter, decaying wood, or below stones. The species is endemic to mainland China and widely distributed in temperate and subtropical regions throughout the country. However, its numbers are dwindling in urban areas, making the insect most abundant in rural areas and nature reserves.

== Life cycle ==
Pyrocoelia pectoralis demonstrates two main types of larvae, overwintering and non-overwintering. Non-overwintering larvae pupate in September, emerging in October, breeding and dying in a one-year cycle. Overwintering larvae live for two years, spending an extra winter in the larval form. These larvae reach larger sizes in their latter three instars than non-overwintering larvae, and is suggested to safeguard against harsh conditions, though laboratory tests could not conclusively identify a notable trigger for overwintering. Regardless of overwintering or not, larvae can be found on vegetation from May to September while overwintering larvae (in diapause) and eggs can be found in small holes in soil from November to April. Larvae go through six instars before becoming sedentary, curling into hook-like shapes which persist through their pupation. Entering this hook-like shape, larvae go through a phase of prepupation with a bloated body and glowing if disturbed. Prepupation lasts an average of 5.3 days for female and 6.2 days for male prepupae, before casting their final larval skins off and pupating. That process sees the development of the adult light organ and continued function of the larval light organ. Pupation lasts an average of 13.4 days for males and 8.4 days for females. After emerging from their pupae, Pyrocoelia pectoralis are said to be in a brief teneral stage, lasting just 4 to 6 hours, which can be seen as a final transitional phase from larvae to adult. This period sees both larval and adult light organs simultaneously functional after emergence, though individuals' elytra soon darken and harden while the larval light organs slowly cease function. Adults' emergence was observed from late September to late October, peaking in mid October. Following emergence, females live for between 4 and 15 days (averaging 8.9 days) and males live for 7 to 19 days (averaging 12.9 days). During this period, Pyrocoelia pectoralis mate, laying dozens of eggs (an average of 72) several hours later. These eggs overwinter for five to six months, hatching the following spring. This whole cycle, as is typical of fireflies, lasts one year from egg to mating adult. Non-wintering eggs have been recorded for other species in the genus, but there seems to be no indication of whether P. pectoralis is capable of successfully matching this cycle.

== Behavior ==
=== Bioluminescence ===
Larvae emerge after sunset, emitting light from the larval light organ, with increased duration of glows and decreased intervals between glows during higher activity. Prior to sunrise, larvae stop moving and return to a latent state until the next sunset. Pupae generally only emit light when agitated. Adult males and females utilize bioluminescence for mating in addition to similar patterns as larvae, as adults will spend days under leaves or in crevices before emerging and beginning their glowing around dusk. Glowing in adults peaks around one hour after dusk, with glowing intensity observed to be inversely correlated to ambient light.

=== Feeding ===
Pyrocoelia pectoralis larvae are well documented to feed on terrestrial snails, especially of the species Bradybaena ravida and Bradybaena similaris which are both crop pests. P. pectoralis utilize their pygopodia to help cling onto snails before biting their heads. Should a snail retract into their shell, Pyrocoelia pectoralis larvae are fully capable of elongating their heads, extending mouthparts under the snails' shells, and continuing to chew into the snail. Feeding on live snails was preferred in field tests. Multiple larvae often feed simultaneously on one snail. Adults feed on nectar rather than snails, though most individuals mate rather quickly after emergence and feeding is less prioritized.

=== Mating ===
Pyrocoelia pectoralis females will mate with multiple males, and are assumed to emit sex pheromones which triggers male mating behaviors. When a male is attracted to the female, they swing their antennae very quickly before landing. Males tap the elytra of females for several minutes while attempting to insert their aedeagus and copulating for several hours. Frequently during this process, other males will display competitive behaviour, attempting to decouple the pair by climbing on the female and pushing the male. Females were found to oviposit hours after copulation and between 1 and 7 times total during their lives. Females deposit an average of 72 eggs in total, with the first 2 ovipositions accounting for a disproportionately large quantity (~85%) of total eggs laid.

=== Defense ===
Pyrocoelia pectoralis have two primary defensive measures consisting of aposematism via bioluminescence and reflexive bleeding. While bioluminescence in general is a deterrent for predation, all stages of P. pectoralis barring the eggs have the capacity to glow when agitated. Additionally, reflex bleeding is common in adults, which is seen in other fireflies that release lucibufagins or steroidal pyrones as strong deterrents.

== Conservation ==
Pyrocoelia pectoralis faces multiple environmental and human-induced threats contributing to its population decline. Habitat loss due to urbanization and agricultural expansion is a primary concern, as it reduces suitable breeding and foraging sites. Light pollution, a consequence of urbanization, poses a significant risk by interfering with species' bioluminescent communication used in mating, which generally results in reduced reproductive success. Additionally, pollutants such as pesticides and fertilizers have direct negative impact on fireflies through contaminated soil and water sources in addition to reducing prey availability for larvae. Climate change may further alter the delicate humidity and temperature balance required for P. pectoralis' survival, particularly the larvae. Additionally, the altering of precipitation patterns due to climate change is exacerbating the degradation of grasslands.

=== Genetics ===
Pyrocoelia pectoralis, despite being in taxa with little research done through much of the 20th century, have seen recent interest in genetic analysis. To date, Pyrocoelia pectoralis has had long-read sequence and chromosome level genome assemblies recorded. These ongoing efforts were first published in 2017, and have served as the basis for additional work on more specific research, which largely involves the genetic basis for mechanisms of bioluminescence and pheromones utilized by the fireflies. Those genetic features which have a strong bearing on what habitats are viable for the species as well as mating and selection, collectively representing genetic data that could very well help inform patterns in P. pectoralis' habitat. Though not yet fully utilized in conservation oriented efforts, such efforts promise to be helpful in analysis, planning, conservation, and restoration efforts for not just Pyrocoelia pectoralis, but the whole of Pyrocoelia and potentially even Lampyridae, which all have seen declines to varying degrees.

=== Habitat loss ===
Urbanization and certain forms of agricultural expansion are the primary causes of habitat loss and degradation for Pyrocoelia pectoralis. Grasslands, the most common habitat for the species, have faced severe degradation and habitat loss as a result of agricultural activity (especially cropland growth and overgrazing) with nearly 90% of the grasslands in northern China and one-third in the entire country being degraded due to agriculture or other anthropogenic factors. The ongoing habitat loss of grasslands is decreasing plant richness and above-ground biomass in their respective regions, a likely contributing factor to the Pyrocoelia pectoralis' population decline.

=== Captive breeding and reintroduction ===
Pyrocoelia pectoralis has been successfully bred in laboratory conditions, and ex-situ conservation (breeding the species in captivity and reintroducing it to habitats where the Pyrocoelia pectoralis population has declined) has been acknowledged as a viable strategy to protect the species from extinction. Additionally, researchers have hypothesized that rearing and releasing Pyrocoelia pectoralis could be utilized as a strategy for reducing the Bradybaena pest snail populations.

=== Habitat restoration ===
Though not the focus of existing conservation projects, several conservation and restoration programs targeting grassland degradation including China's "Great Green Wall," "Grain for Green," and "Grassland Ecological Protection Program" should ideally support P. pectoralis. These programs are aimed at containing degradation of grasslands, and have succeeded in improving vegetation coverage, biodiversity, and ecosystem services. Such habitat restoration programs are currently the most significant efforts in supporting P. pectoralis populations.
