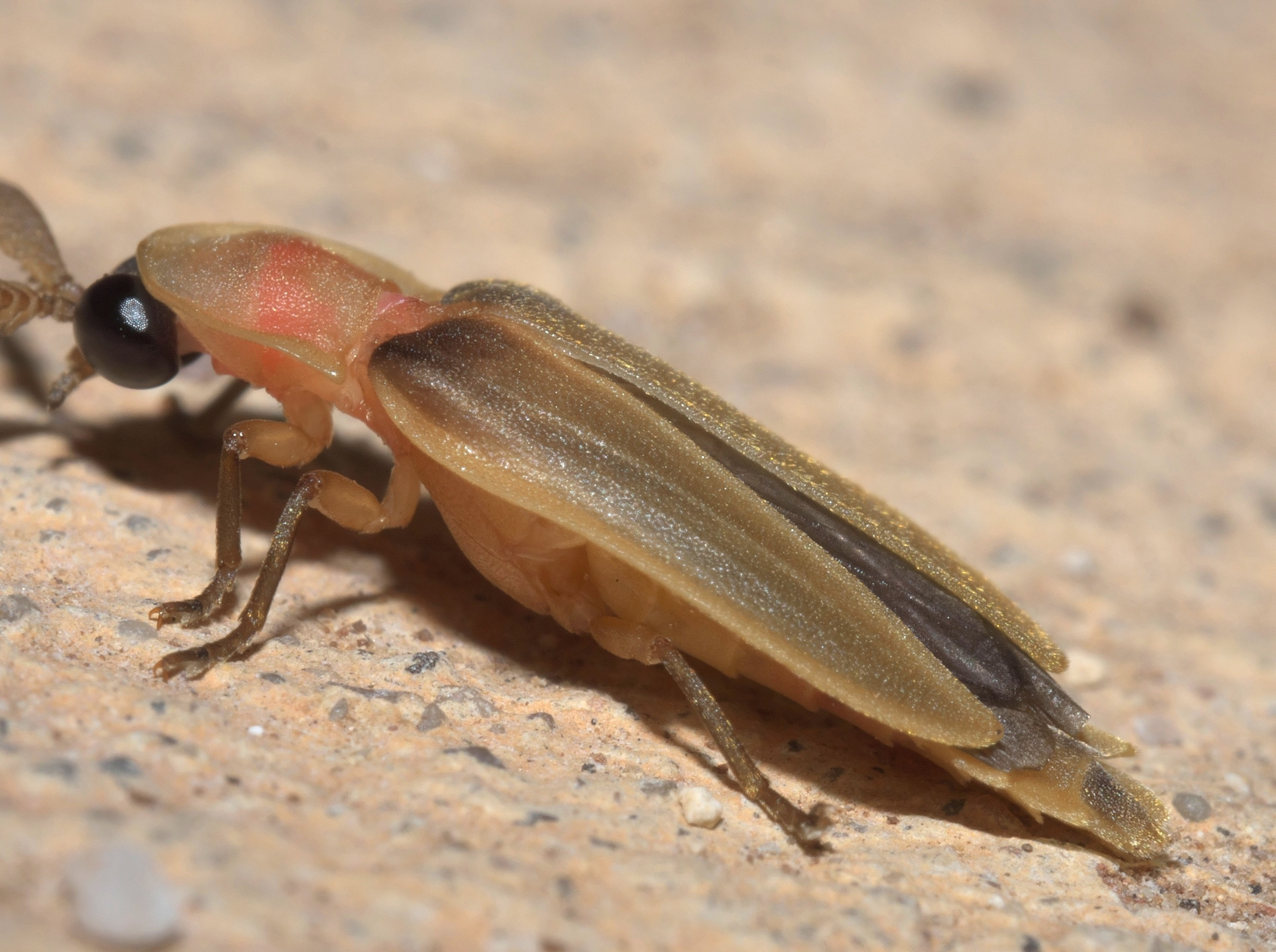
- Pleotomus pallens, Texas

Scientific classification
- Domain: Eukaryota
- Kingdom: Animalia
- Phylum: Arthropoda
- Class: Insecta
- Order: Coleoptera
- Suborder: Polyphaga
- Infraorder: Elateriformia
- Family: Lampyridae
- Genus: Pleotomus
- Species: P. pallens

Binomial name
- Pleotomus pallens LeConte, 1866

= Pleotomus pallens =

Species of firefly

Pleotomus pallens is a species of firefly in the beetle family Lampyridae. It is found in Central America and North America. The female firefly of this species emits a brighter form of light than the male and this light decreases after she lays eggs; after she has performed this duty, she dies.
