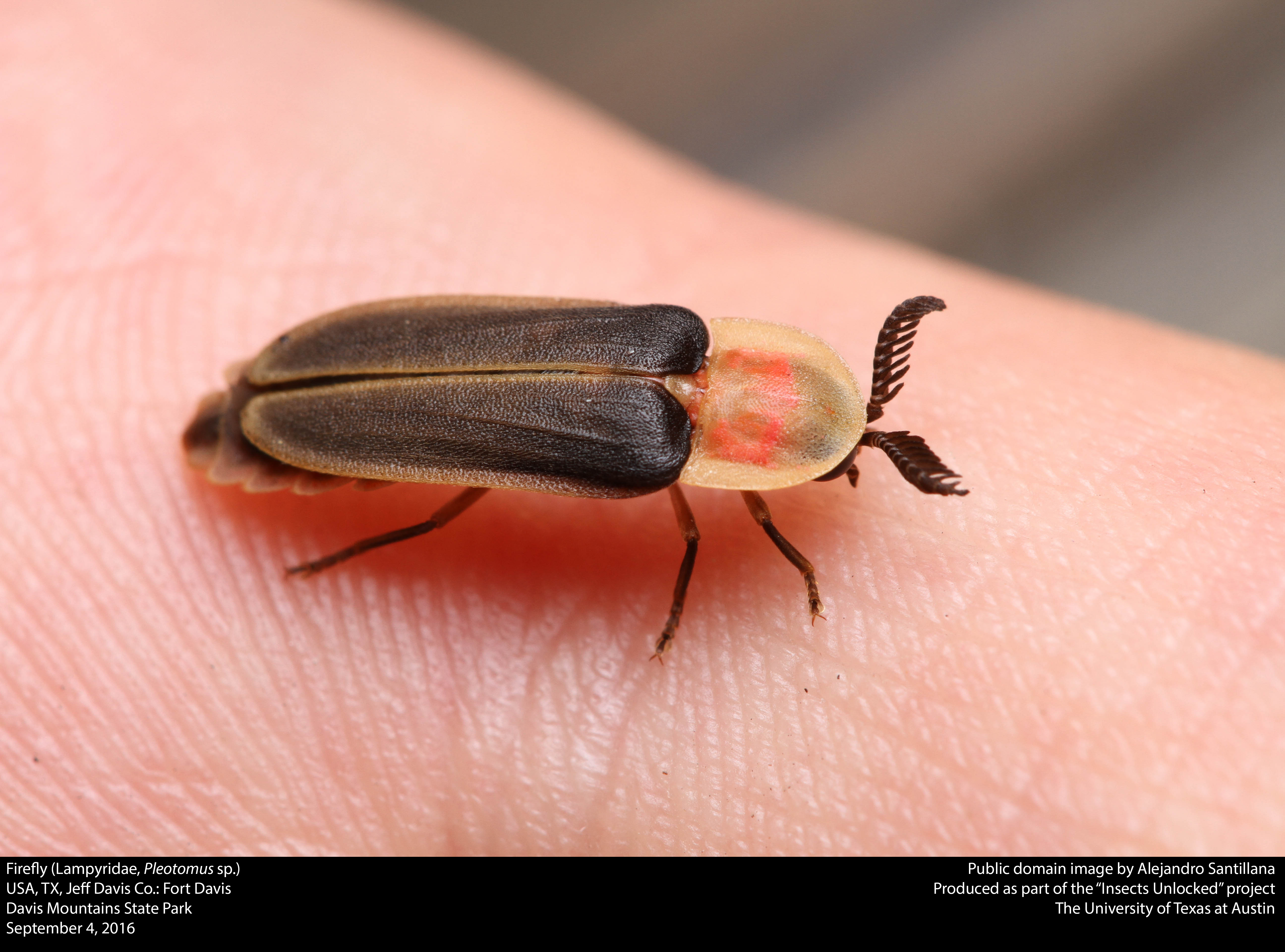
- Pleotomus sp.
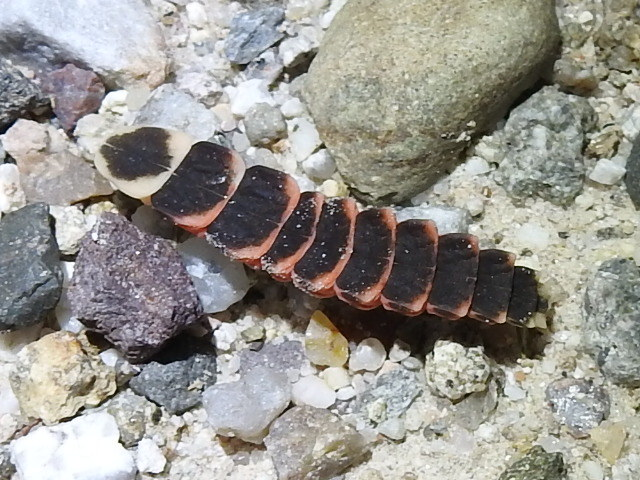
- Pleotomus nigripennis (larva)

Scientific classification
- Kingdom: Animalia
- Phylum: Arthropoda
- Class: Insecta
- Order: Coleoptera
- Suborder: Polyphaga
- Infraorder: Elateriformia
- Family: Lampyridae
- Tribe: Pleotomini
- Genus: Pleotomus; LeConte, 1861

= Pleotomus =

Genus of beetles

Pleotomus is a genus of fireflies in the family Lampyridae. There are about five described species in Pleotomus.

== Species ==
These five species belong to the genus Pleotomus:

- Pleotomus cerinus Zaragoza, 2002
- Pleotomus davisii LeConte, 1881
- Pleotomus emmiltos Zaragoza, 2002
- Pleotomus nigripennis LeConte, 1885
- Pleotomus pallens LeConte, 1866
