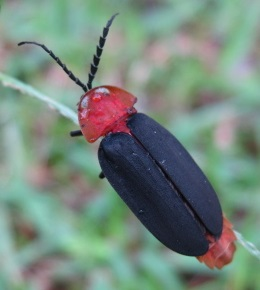
- Pyrocoelia atripennis

Scientific classification
- Kingdom: Animalia
- Phylum: Arthropoda
- Class: Insecta
- Order: Coleoptera
- Suborder: Polyphaga
- Infraorder: Elateriformia
- Family: Lampyridae
- Genus: Pyrocoelia; Gorham, 1880

Synonyms
- List: Eulampyris Fairmaire, 1897; Eulampys Fairmaire, 1897; Eurylampyris Fairmaire, 1897; Lychnocrepis Motschulsky, 1853; Lychnuris Blanchard, 1845; Pyrocaelia; Stroggulus Motschulsky, 1845; Strongylomorphus Motschulsky, 1853; Strongylus Mannerheim, 1846

= Pyrocoelia =

Genus of beetles

Pyrocoelia is a genus of beetles belonging to the family Lampyridae.

The species of this genus are found in Southeastern Asia.

== Species ==
The following species are recognised in the genus Pyrocoelia:

- Pyrocoelia abdominalis Nakane, 1979
- Pyrocoelia amplissima E.Olivier, 1886
- Pyrocoelia analis (Fabricius, 1801)
- Pyrocoelia antricola (Blair, 1929)
- Pyrocoelia atricolor Pic, 1923
- Pyrocoelia atripennis Lewis, 1896
- Pyrocoelia atripes Pic, 1937
- Pyrocoelia atriventris Pic, 1938
- Pyrocoelia aurita (Motschulsky, 1845)
- Pyrocoelia bicolor (Fabricius, 1801)
- Pyrocoelia breviapicalis Pic, 1927
- Pyrocoelia cenwanglaoensis Zhu, Xu & Zhen, 2022
- Pyrocoelia collaris Gorham, 1892
- Pyrocoelia consobrina E.Olivier, 1886
- Pyrocoelia cribripennis E.Olivier, 1891
- Pyrocoelia discicollis (Kiesenwetter, 1874)
- Pyrocoelia discoidalis E.Olivier, 1886
- Pyrocoelia enervis (E.Olivier, 1909)
- Pyrocoelia feai E.Olivier, 1891
- Pyrocoelia ferranti E.Olivier, 1913
- Pyrocoelia flaviventris (Fairmaire, 1878)
- Pyrocoelia formosana E.Olivier, 1911
- Pyrocoelia fumata (Fairmaire, 1886)
- Pyrocoelia fumigata Gorham, 1880
- Pyrocoelia fumosa (Gorham, 1883)
- Pyrocoelia fuscescens (E.Olivier, 1911)
- Pyrocoelia gracilicornis Pic, 1937
- Pyrocoelia grandicollis Fairmaire, 1891
- Pyrocoelia grata (E.Olivier, 1909)
- Pyrocoelia hickeri Pic, 1925
- Pyrocoelia incostata Pic, 1917
- Pyrocoelia iriomotensis Nakane, 1985
- Pyrocoelia iwasakii Matsumura, 1918
- Pyrocoelia kanamarui Kishida, 1936
- Pyrocoelia lacordairei E.Olivier, 1883
- Pyrocoelia lateralis Gorham, 1880
- Pyrocoelia lunata Yiu, 2017
- Pyrocoelia matsumurai Nakane, 1963
- Pyrocoelia microceras E.Olivier, 1891
- Pyrocoelia mixta (Gyllenhal, 1817)
- Pyrocoelia miyako Nakane, 1981
- Pyrocoelia morosa E.Olivier, 1886
- Pyrocoelia motschulskyi (Motschulsky, 1853)
- Pyrocoelia moupinensis Fairmaire, 1889
- Pyrocoelia oblita Gorham, 1903
- Pyrocoelia oblonga (Motschulsky, 1861)
- Pyrocoelia opaca E.Olivier, 1885
- Pyrocoelia oshimana Nakane, 1985
- Pyrocoelia pectoralis E.Olivier, 1883
- Pyrocoelia pekinensis Gorham, 1880
- Pyrocoelia plagiata Gorham, 1880
- Pyrocoelia praetexta E.Olivier, 1911
- Pyrocoelia prolongata Jeng & Lai, 1999
- Pyrocoelia pygidialis Pic, 1926
- Pyrocoelia rubrothorax Zhu, Xu & Zhen, 2022
- Pyrocoelia rufa E.Olivier, 1886
- Pyrocoelia sanguiniventer E.Olivier, 1911
- Pyrocoelia scutellaris Pic, 1926
- Pyrocoelia signaticollis E.Olivier, 1886
- Pyrocoelia sternalis Bourgeois, 1895
- Pyrocoelia straminea E.Olivier, 1886
- Pyrocoelia submarginata Pic, 1926
- Pyrocoelia tappana Matsumura, 1918
- Pyrocoelia terminata Gorham, 1880
- Pyrocoelia thibetiana E.Olivier, 1886
- Pyrocoelia tonkinensis E.Olivier, 1886
- Pyrocoelia umbrosa E.Olivier, 1902
- BOLD:AES0582 (Pyrocoelia sp.)
- BOLD:AES0583 (Pyrocoelia sp.)
