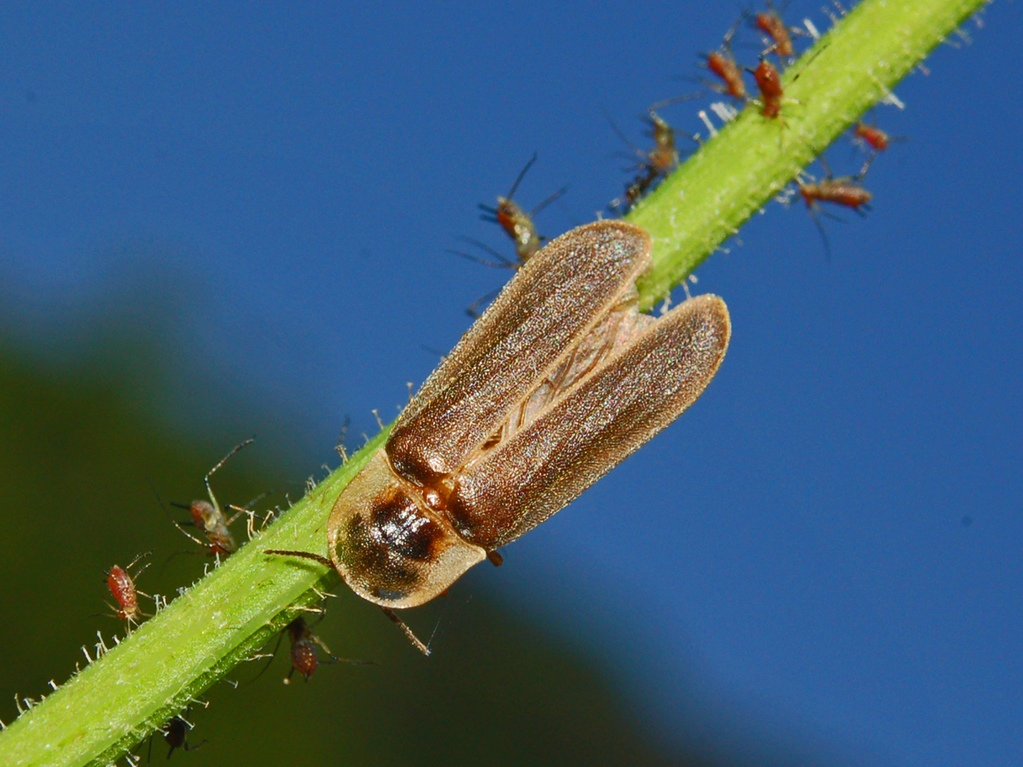
- Male

Conservation status
- Near Threatened (IUCN 3.1)

Scientific classification
- Kingdom: Animalia
- Phylum: Arthropoda
- Clade: Pancrustacea
- Class: Insecta
- Order: Coleoptera
- Suborder: Polyphaga
- Infraorder: Elateriformia
- Family: Lampyridae
- Genus: Lampyris
- Species: L. noctiluca

Binomial name
- Lampyris noctiluca (Linnaeus, 1767)

Synonyms
- Cantharis noctiluca Linnaeus, 1767; Lampyris bellieri Reiche, 1858; Lampyris carreti Olivier, 1895; Lampyris longipennis Motschulsky, 1853; Lampyris minor Olivier, 1901; Lampyris obscurella Motschulsky, 1853; Lampyris parvicollis Olivier, 1901; Lampyris sibirica Gebler, 1847; Lampyris submucronata Rey, 1891; Lampyris thoracica Motschulsky, 1853

= Lampyris noctiluca =

Species of beetle

Lampyris noctiluca, the common glowworm of Europe (see also "glowworm"), is the type species of beetle in the genus Lampyris and the family Lampyridae.

Lampyris noctiluca presents conspicuous sexual dimorphism. The males are winged, with brown elytra, a clearer pronotum and a large brown spot in the middle, while females are larviform, with no wings, and they are often twice the size of the males (up to 25 millimetres (1 in) in length).

These beetles use their bioluminescence to attract mates. The adult females are mostly famed for their glow, although all stages of their life cycle are capable of glowing.

In Britain, this species is fairly common, compared to its cousin Phosphaenus hemipterus—the lesser glow worm—which is very rare.

The etymology of Lampyrus is from Greek for "shining ones"; the genus includes species known as fireflies or lightning bugs. Contrary to its name, it is not worm-like, but a beetle. These beetles are typically the most active at night and spend their day under debris, or in the ground. The larvae are also nocturnal and rarely seen, only coming out when the conditions are right in the months of April to October. The adult stage is much shorter than the larvae stage but they are much easier to spot then as they glow for a few hours and only stop glowing after mating.

== Distribution ==
The range of this beetle stretches from Portugal and Great Britain in the west, right across Europe, Africa and Asia to China in the east. Reports from Ireland are unverified; the Irish Biodiversity Database does not have any records. It also survives further north than any other firefly, almost reaching the Arctic Circle. It is not found in North America, South America, South Asia, Australia and Antarctica.

== Geography ==
The Lampris noctiluca has been found mainly in valleys in Wales and Scotland with other appearance in Europe, such as Estonia, Belgium and Finland. They typically favour chalky and limestone areas, open grass, hedges, and woodland and will rarely be found on land which has been improved for agricultural purposes. They prefer open air, especially for evolutionary purposes for the female to be able to attract a male through her light display during the months of June, July, and August.

== Physical description ==
The adult females range in size from 12 to 20 mm while males are significantly smaller. The larvae are only a few millimetres in length (1). They also have segmented bodies such that females may emit a bioluminescent glow (2). They vary from brownish to blackish. Males are equipped with two pairs of wings, using the second pair for flying and the first pair, known as elytra, to cover the second. Females, however, do not fly. The insects are soft-bodied and elongated in form, with a head concealed by a pronotum and threadlike antennae. Luminosity is confined to the last few abdominal segments. Among them, the adult female is notably the most luminous, using her glowing ability to attract males, while larvae also glow but more faintly and only intermittently. The light produced is cold light which benefits the species as they waste little heat. They transform only about 3 percent of their chemical energy into waste heat which is relatively efficient compared to other glowing species. Despite the larvae's similarity to adults in having segmented bodies and six legs near the head, their mode of movement can make them resemble caterpillars (1).

== Light production ==
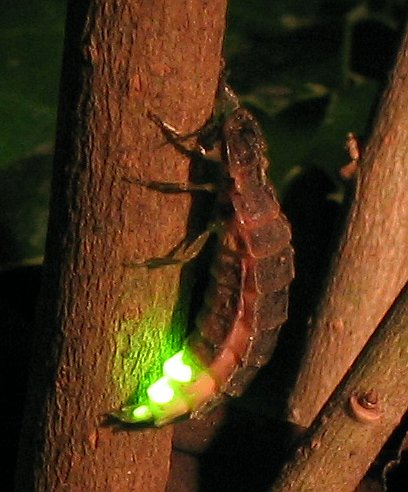
Female Lampyris noctiluca

Light production is vital for Lampyris noctiluca. The females emit yellowish-green light from the translucent underside of their last three abdominal segments to attract the smaller males, which are winged. They will glow for two hours and then retreat back into their hiding place until the next night, or stop glowing as soon as they find a mate. The females can survive for at least 10 consecutive nights doing this.

The light can be seen by males up to 45 metres away. The light is emitted continuously, although females will wave their abdomens from side to side, which gives the impression of it brightening and dimming. Larvae are sometimes seen to glow, although they seem able to turn off their light more easily than females, especially when disturbed. The pupae glow when disturbed.

The insect can regulate its light production by controlling the oxygen supply to the light emitting membranes containing luciferin. The chemical reaction producing the light from luciferin is catalysed by luciferase, the exact chemical structure of which is determined by the glow worms' individual genetic structure, which in turn determines subtle differences in the light produced from individual to individual. Virtually all of the energy produced is light; only 2% is heat.

The brightness of the glow is used by the males as an indicator of female fecundity. Females compete against each other for mating access.

== Reproduction ==
In the reproduction process of Lampyris noctiluca, the female plays a crucial role in attracting mates. To catch the attention of male glow worms, which fly about a metre off the ground, a female climbs a plant stalk. By positioning herself above most ground-level vegetation and bending her abdomen upwards, she showcases her glowing organs, signaling to any males passing by.

Unique to Lampyris noctiluca is its method of sex determination, which is influenced by hormones, a rarity among insects. Sexual differentiation between males and females begins during the fourth larval instar, with distinctions being initially subtle. Male cells in the apical tissue of the gonads start to divide at this stage, contrasting with female cells, which divide in the basal tissue. Remarkably, transplanting testes into females before the fifth instar leads to masculinisation, whereas similar procedures performed later or attempts to feminise males do not result in sex reversal. This demonstrates that while testes can transform pre-fifth-instar female gonads into male ones, ovaries do not have a feminizing effect on males, highlighting a unique aspect of the species' biology (2).

== Food ==
They undergo their entire feeding phase during the larval stage, The larvae are fierce predators and roam leaf litter in search of slugs and snails (1). They do this by injecting their prey with digestive enzymes and then consuming the liquefied internal contents. Adults lack mouthparts entirely, rendering them unable to eat.

== Light pollution problems ==
These beetles rely heavily on light for their reproductive processes. However, the rise of artificial lighting, even in rural settings, poses a significant challenge. Such light sources can complicate the males' search for partners. A 2014 study highlighted that minimal levels of light pollution can disrupt the mating behaviour of male L. noctiluca, as they struggle to find females. This research underscores the potential link between declining glow-worm populations and light pollution, suggesting that it warrants consideration as a contributing factor (5).

== Habitat ==
They are found in old-growth grassland, especially on chalk and limestone soils. They are also found in verges, hedgebanks, and on heaths. The larvae live in sheltered places, under rocks and wood, but do crawl over different terrain.

== Life cycle ==
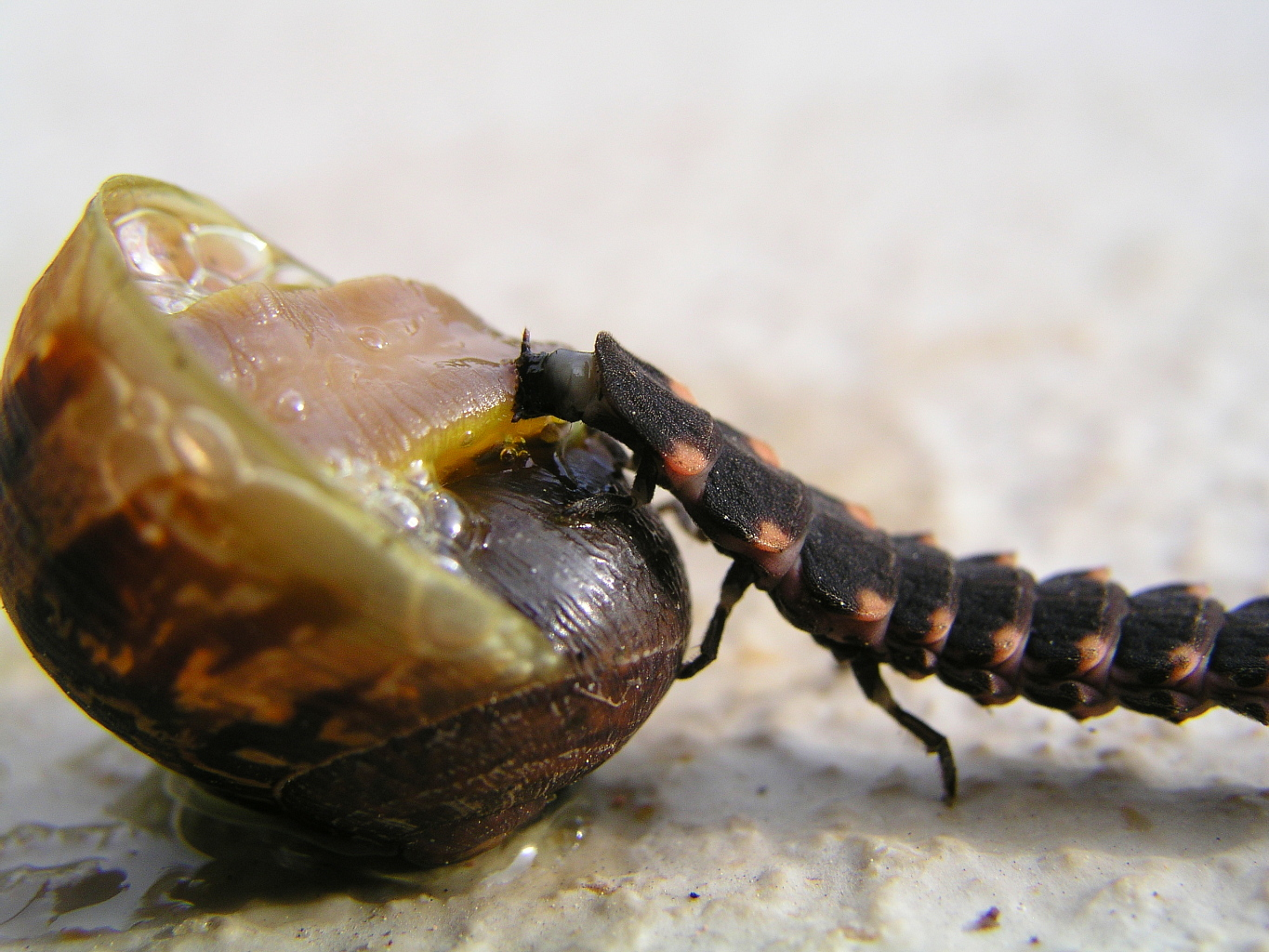
Lampyris noctiluca – larva feeding

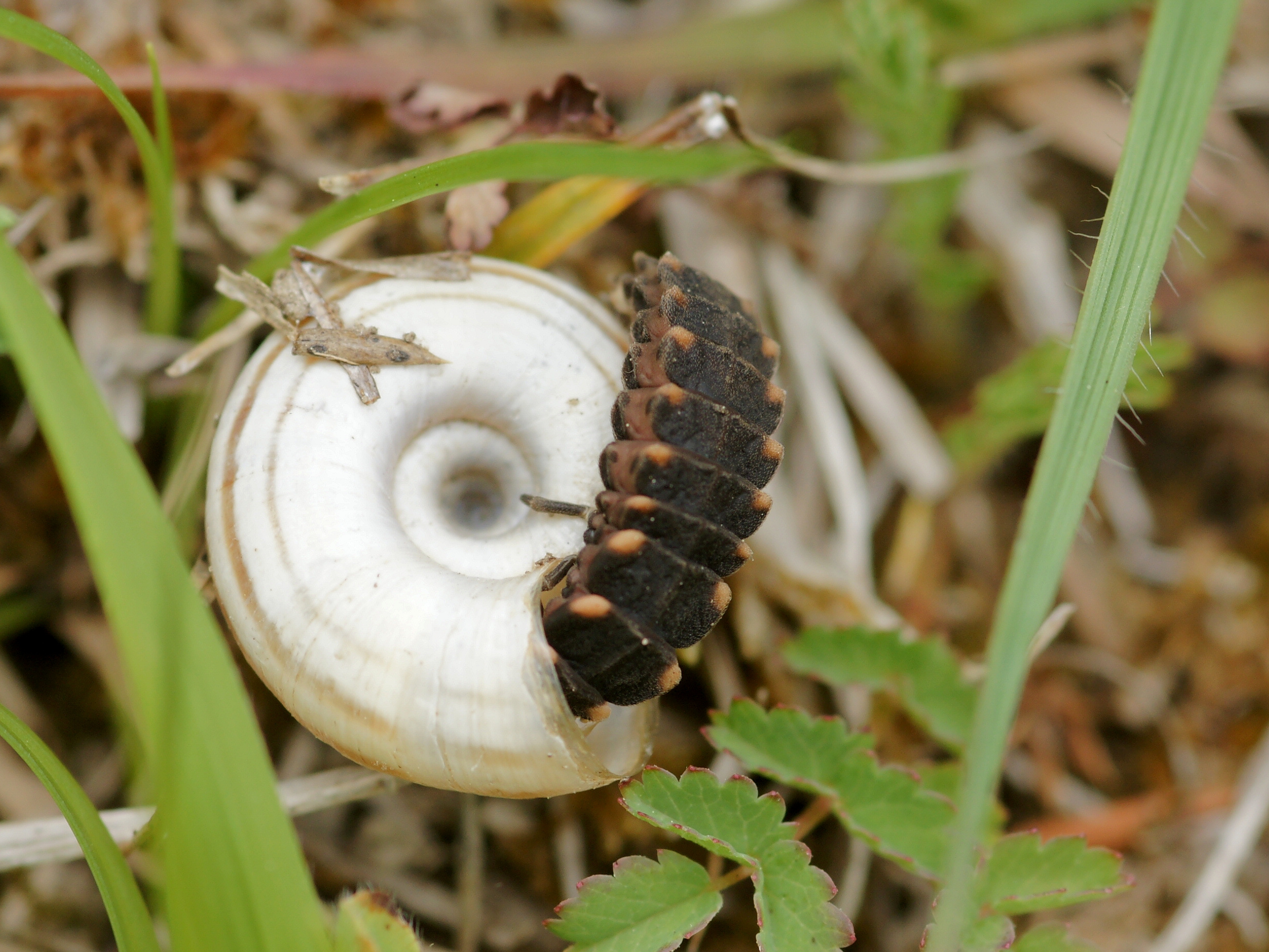
Larva feeding on snail – dorsal view

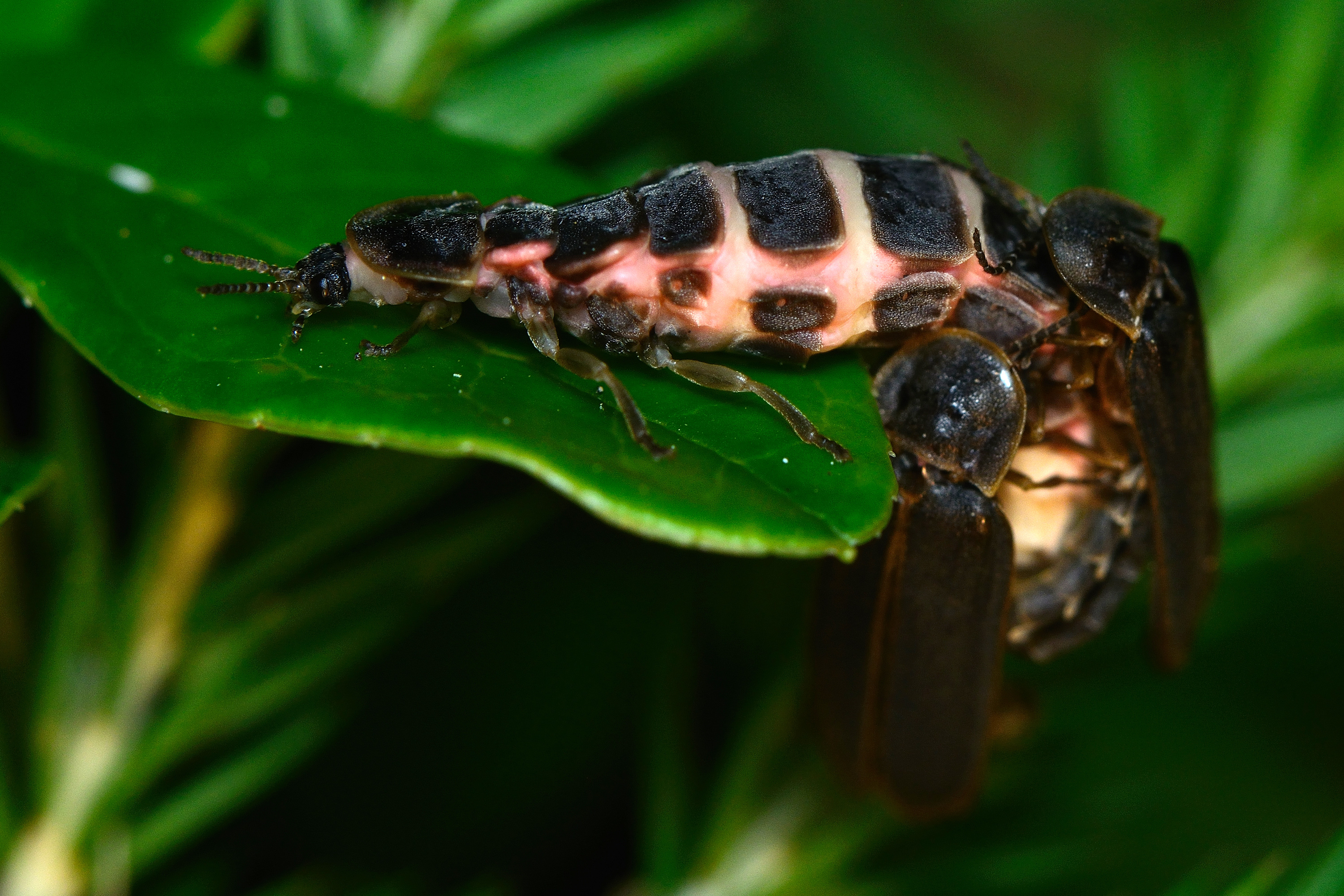
Female and two male glow worms mating.

Once the females have attracted the males with their glow, they mate, lay eggs, and die.

Typically, 50–100 eggs are laid over three days, with the adult not surviving to see them hatch. They are laid in fairly moist places, e.g. stems of grass, under moss and under leaf litter.

The eggs are pale yellow, 1 mm across. They may glow faintly yellow.

The eggs hatch after two or three weeks, possibly longer in colder climates. Larvae and adult females look similar, but larvae have bright spots on each of 12 segments, whereas adult females have a completely black back.

The predatory larvae feed for two or three years on slugs and snails which they inject with a brown, toxic, digestive fluid, delivered by a series of nips and bites. The poison takes time to work, and the larva must be careful not to become stuck to any protective mucus that its prey may secrete. The prey is gradually paralysed and the digestive fluid turns part of it into a brown broth that the larva can lap up. The prey remains alive, and some partially eaten victims have been known to crawl away after the meal.

The slugs and snails are often 200 times the weight of the beetle larva. The larvae are nocturnal, and are most active during moist conditions, when their prey are most active.

The larvae may moult four to five times in their lifetimes. They spend winters under logs, stones, wood holes, or leaf litter, their bodies drawn in like concertinas, hibernating as food becomes increasingly difficult to find. They awaken in spring, and the cycle is repeated for one more year, or possibly two.

They become adults from May to July or sometimes later, surviving on food reserves accumulated during time as a larva, and dying after reproducing.

== Threats to species numbers ==
Threats include habitat destruction, habitat fragmentation, pesticide use, pollution, distraction by artificial lights, insufficient grazing and climate change.
