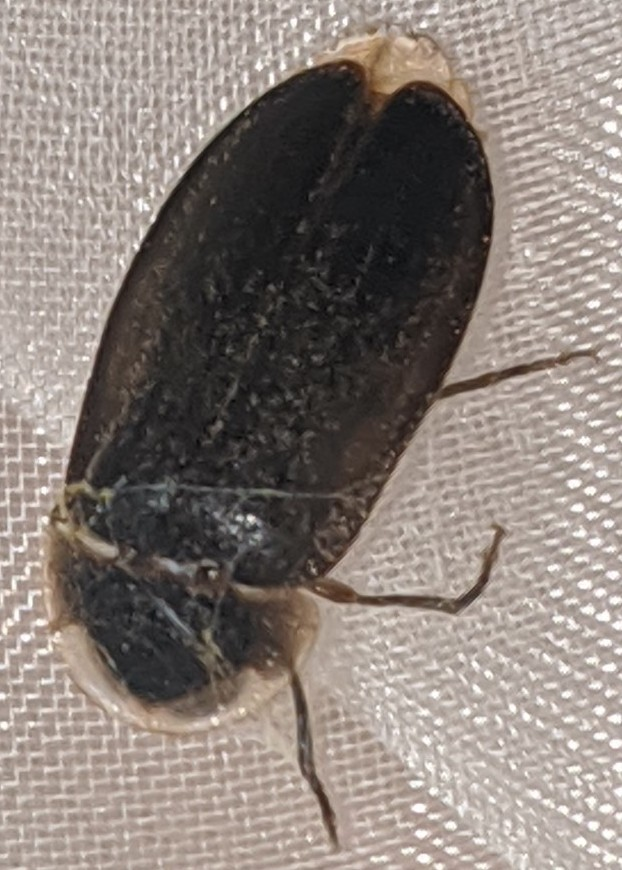
- Male adult of Lamprigera yunnana

Scientific classification
- Kingdom: Animalia
- Phylum: Arthropoda
- Class: Insecta
- Order: Coleoptera
- Suborder: Polyphaga
- Infraorder: Elateriformia
- Family: Lampyridae
- Subfamily: Lampyrinae; Rafinesque, 1815

Tribes
- Cratomorphini; Lamprocerini; Lampyrini; Photinini; Pleotomini

= Lampyrinae =

Subfamily of beetles

The Lampyrinae are a large subfamily of fireflies (Lampyridae). The exact delimitation, and the internal systematics, have until recently been a matter of debate; for long this group was used as a "wastebin taxon" to hold any fireflies with insufficiently resolved relationships. Regardless, they are very diverse even as a good monophyletic group, containing flashing and continuous-glow fireflies from the Holarctic and some tropical forms as well. The ancestral Lampyrinae probably had no or very primitive light signals; in any case several modern lineages appear to have returned to the pheromone communication of their ancestors independently.

== Systematics ==
The group has recently been examined using molecular phylogenetics, using fairly comprehensive sampling.
