= Nyctocrepis =

- Nyctocrepis monnei

Scientific classification
- Kingdom: Animalia
- Phylum: Arthropoda
- Clade: Pancrustacea
- Class: Insecta
- Order: Coleoptera
- Suborder: Polyphaga
- Infraorder: Elateriformia
- Family: Lampyridae
- Subfamily: Cladodinae
- Genus: Nyctocrepis; Motschulsky, 1853

Synonyms
- Fenestracladodes Pic, 1935

Genus of beetles

Nyctocrepis is a genus of beetles of the family Lampyridae.

== Species ==
- subgenus Nyctocrepis
  - Nyctocrepis demoulini Motschulsky, 1853 (Brazil: Santa Catarina)
  - Nyctocrepis monnei Alexandre, Takiya & Silveira, 2026 (Brazil: Rio de Janeiro)
  - Nyctocrepis stellata (Gorham, 1880) (Brazil: Rio de Janeiro)
- subgenus Fenestratocladodes Pic, 1935
  - Nyctocrepis malleri (Pic, 1935) (Brazil: Santa Catarina)

== Taxonomy ==
This genus was formerly synonymized with Cladodes by Olivier in 1907, but was revalidated and revised by Bocakova et al. in 2022. In this same study, the monotypic subgenus Fenestratocladodes was transferred from Cladodes to Nyctocrepis.
