= Phausis nigra =

Scientific classification
- Domain: Eukaryota
- Kingdom: Animalia
- Phylum: Arthropoda
- Class: Insecta
- Order: Coleoptera
- Suborder: Polyphaga
- Infraorder: Elateriformia
- Family: Lampyridae
- Subfamily: Lamprohizinae
- Genus: Phausis
- Species: P. nigra

Binomial name
- Phausis nigra Hopping, 1937

Species of beetle

Phausis nigra is a species of firefly in the beetle family Lampyridae. It is found in North America.
