= Opuntia pubescens =

- Opuntia pubescens with cladodes fallen from the main stem after mild knock

Conservation status
- Least Concern (IUCN 3.1)

Scientific classification
- Kingdom: Plantae
- Clade: Tracheophytes
- Clade: Angiosperms
- Clade: Eudicots
- Order: Caryophyllales
- Family: Cactaceae
- Genus: Opuntia
- Species: O. pubescens

Binomial name
- Opuntia pubescens H.L.Wendl. ex Pfeiff.

Synonyms
- List: Cactus pubescens (H.L.Wendl. ex Pfeiff.) Lem.; Cactus nanus Kunth; Cactus opuntia var. nana DC.; Cereus nanus (Kunth) DC.; Corynopuntia dumetorum (A.Berger) F.M.Knuth; Grusonia dumetorum (A.Berger) E.F.Anderson; Opuntia depauperata Britton & Rose; Opuntia dumetorum A.Berger; Opuntia hoffmannii Bravo; Opuntia infesta (F.Ritter) Iliff; Opuntia leptarthra F.A.C.Weber; Opuntia nana (DC.) Vis.; Opuntia pascoensis Britton & Rose; Opuntia pestifer Britton & Rose; Opuntia pumila Rose; Opuntia tayapayensis Cárdenas; Opuntia vulgaris f. nana (DC.) Schelle; Opuntia vulgaris var. nana (DC.) K.Schum.; Platyopuntia dumetorum (A.Berger) F.Ritter; Platyopuntia infesta F.Ritter; Platyopuntia nana (Kunth) F.Ritter

Species of flowering plant

Cladodes dangling from the main stem, ready to fall off

Areoles with slender spines and tiny glochids

An areole atop each velvety tubercle

Side view of tubercles, spines and glochids

Opuntia pubescens, the velvet bur cactus, is a species of neotropical cactus growing where long dry seasons occur. It belongs to the family Cactaceae.

== Discription ==
Among the many cactus species, Opuntia pubescens is fairly easy to recognize. Here are its key identification features:

- It is relatively small for a cactus, usually growing around 20 cm (7.9 in) high but can reach 80 cm (31 in). Branching from the base, very spiny stems are segmented into short, somewhat cylindrical to flattened joints up to about 15 cm (6 in) long or longer, but only to 3 cm (1 1/8 in) thick. The joints' surfaces are broken into spiraling low bumps known as tubercles. Clusters of spines grow atop each tubercle, and tubercle surfaces are densely short-hairy, or velvety, to hairless.
- Branching off the stems are smaller, spiny, somewhat rounded to ellipsoid parts known as burs or "cladodes." These easily detach from the plant when disturbed, and readily attach to passing animals. When cladodes fall to the ground they can root and grow to form new plants.
- Atop each tubercle, a cluster of spines arises from a location known as the areole. Each areole supports 1 to up to 7 spines up to 3.5 cm (1 3/8 in) long. The literature disagrees about spine color, but those seen on this page are white, sometimes turning brownish. Spine surfaces are covered with minute, backward-pointing barbs, causing the spines to be very painful when being removed from the skin! Surrounding spine bases are numerous minute glochids which cause aggravating irritations when lodged in the skin.
- The flowers' tepals up to 2.2 cm (7/8 in) long, and yellow, some with a reddish mid-line. Stamens have yellowish green filaments and on the ovary the style is yellow to pale green and topped with a stigma with 6-8 lobes.
- Fruits are up to 3.5 cm (1 3/8 in) long and half as wide, red or reddish, and with a red pulp containing several seeds.

== Distribution ==
Opuntia pubescens displays a disjunct distribution: one part of their native area is most of Mexico, and Guatemala, the other part in South America, from Venezuela south through the Andes area to Bolivia. It has been introduced and is invasive in South Africa.

== Habitat ==
In southeastern Mexico, Opuntia pubescens occurs in tropical deciduous forest and dry scrubland, mainly in disturbed areas and on calcareous soils, at elevations of 1,000 to 2,200 m (3,300 to 7,200 ft). In Colombia, it is found in dry scrub in association with Aristido adscensionis, Condylidietum cuatrecasasi, Cordia curassavica, Jotropha gossypiifolia and Lippia origanoides.

== As an invasive species ==
In South Africa, Opuntia pubescens has become invasive. First it was noticed in the Pretoria National Botanical Garden, then it was found invading a nearby hill. It was judged as a threat with these possible impacts:

- decrease of grazing area for livestock, injure the animals and curtail their movement
- lower the value of pasture areas
- displace indigenous plants
- injure humans and curtail their movement

In 2026, the South African National Biodiversity Institute was seeking bids to clear the species from Pretoria National Botanical Garden, Tierpoort and along a road in Gauteng.

In South Africa, fruits produced by Opuntia pubescens are reported as sterile, not producing viable seeds. However, the cactus's spiny cladodes attach themselves to small mammals known as dassies, who transport the cladodes to new locations, where they root and grow into new plants.

== Pollination strategy ==
As of 2026, the pollinator of Opuntia pubescens was not documented in the literature, though the cactus's flowers were considered to be modified for hummingbird pollination.

== Uses by humans ==
=== As living fences ===
In Ecuador, Opuntia pubescens has been used for making living fences, presumably the spines keeping livestock in a confined space.

=== In gardens ===
Despite its dangerous spines and history of easily spreading into inappropriate areas, some gardening websites list it.

=== Edible fruits ===
The fruits of Opuntia pubescens are edible, if one can deal with the spines.

=== In traditional medicine ===
In Mexico, Mixtec people of the state of Oaxaca have made infusions of the cladodes for a "tea" to improve the memory.

== Taxonomy ==
In 1837, Ludwig Karl Georg Pfeiffer validly published and named Opuntia pubescens, with the name taken from an earlier unpublished catalog by Heinrich Ludolph Wendland. The catalog dealt with plants in the garden at Herrnhut, Saxony, Germany. Pfeiffer recognized Wendland as establishing the name in his author declaration for the taxon: "H.L.Wendl. ex Pfeiff." The garden and Herrnhut were mentioned in his shorthand note "Catal. horti Herrnhus".

=== Phylogeny ===
Phylogenetic analysis based on genome size and complete chloroplast genomes indicates that Opuntia pubescens is closely related to the Mexican and Central American species Opuntia auberi, Opuntia dejecta, Opuntia gaumeri, Opuntia caracassana, Opuntia jamaicensis and Opuntia guatemalensis. Earlier it had been suggested that cacti identified as Opuntia pubescens in Peru actually were Opuntia pestifer, but the genes confirmed that the Peruvian plants were Opuntia pubescens. The listed species all are assigned to a "Nopalea clade".

Opuntia pubescens is triploid, having three sets of chromosomes (3x), and approximately 33 chromosomes.

=== Etymology ===
The genus name Opuntia has an uncertain origin, though possibly it is based on the name of a Greek town (perhaps Opus), where a cactus-like plant grew.

The species name pubescens is from the Latin pubescens, the present participle of pubescere, meaning "to reach maturity" or "to develop soft hair or down", referring to this taxon's hairy surfaces.
