= Phausis inaccensa =

Conservation status
- Least Concern (IUCN 3.1)

Scientific classification
- Kingdom: Animalia
- Phylum: Arthropoda
- Clade: Pancrustacea
- Class: Insecta
- Order: Coleoptera
- Suborder: Polyphaga
- Infraorder: Elateriformia
- Family: Lampyridae
- Genus: Phausis
- Species: P. inaccensa

Binomial name
- Phausis inaccensa LeConte, 1878

Species of beetle

Female firefly from the Phausis genus from Madison County, Arkansas

Ventral view of female Phausis firefly

Phausis inaccensa, also known as the shadow ghost, is a species of firefly in the family of beetles known as Lampyridae. It is found in central and eastern United States. The larviform females of the species are bioluminescent, whereas the males are winged but lanternless.

== Description ==
Phausis inaccensa are very small fireflies, the size of a short grain of rice, measuring about 0.2 in (4 – 6 mm) in length. Males have textured wing covers and "windshields" on their head shields, or pronotum. They do not have lanterns, but many males do have pale patches on their terminal abdominal segments. Females are pale yellow and do not fly.

== Life Cycle ==
=== Adults ===
Adult male P. inaccensa fly around as dark falls in the early spring, searching for the glowing females that are perched on leaf litter, low vegetation, or sticks on the ground. The females turn their glowing tails upward so they can be spotted by the males. Females can mate more than one time.

=== Eggs and Larvae ===
Once a female lays her clutch of about 25 eggs, she guards them until she dies in one to two weeks. The eggs hatch approximately 35 days after they are laid. The larvae are extremely tiny, approximately 0.05 in (1 – 2 mm) and are bioluminescent.

== Range ==
P. inaccensa has been recorded in the eastern and central United States, including Texas, Oklahoma, Arkansas, Mississippi, Tennessee, Alabama, Georgia, North Carolina, Pennsylvania, Indiana, and the Great Lakes regions of Michigan and Minnesota.

== Habitat ==
Adults are found both in dry forested ridgetops and in damper areas such as near forest streams and river bottoms.

== Light Production ==
Females have two spots on their upturned tails that glow to attract males. Males do not have lanterns.
