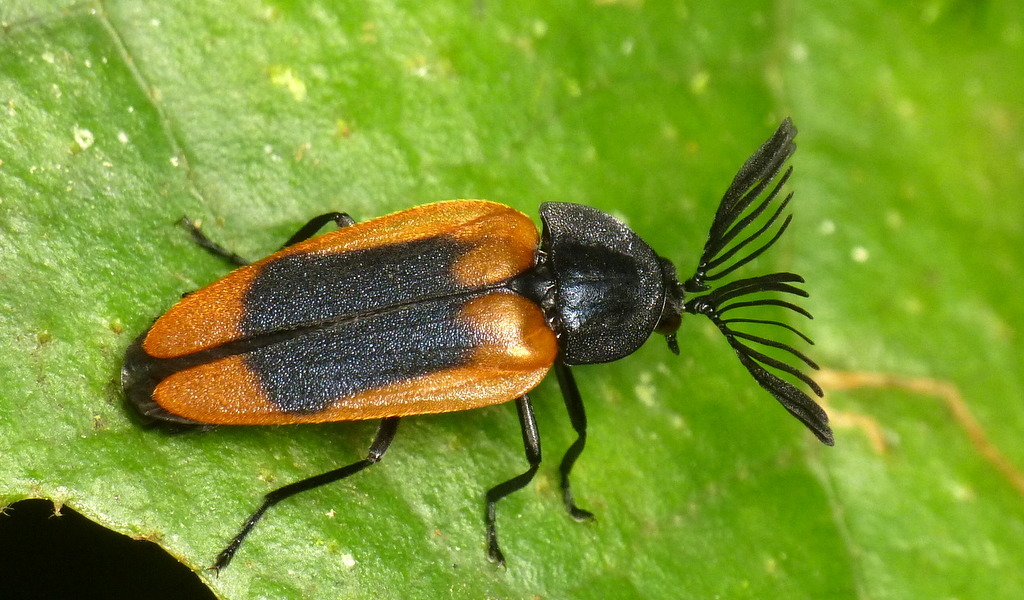

Scientific classification
- Kingdom: Animalia
- Phylum: Arthropoda
- Class: Insecta
- Order: Coleoptera
- Suborder: Polyphaga
- Infraorder: Elateriformia
- Family: Lampyridae
- Subfamily: Cladodinae; Bocakova, Campello-Gonçalves and Da Silveira, 2022

Genera
- Andecladodes Bocakova, Campello-Gonçalves and Da Silveira, 2022; Brasilocladodes Bocakova, Campello-Gonçalves and Da Silveira, 2022; Cladodes Solier in Gay, 1849; Dodacles E. Olivier, 1885; Dryptelytra Laporte, 1833; Ledocas E. Olivier, 1885; Nyctocrepis Motschulsky, 1853

= Cladodinae =

Subfamily of fireflies

The Cladodinae are a subfamily of fireflies (Lampyridae) containing 7 genera and 64 known species.
