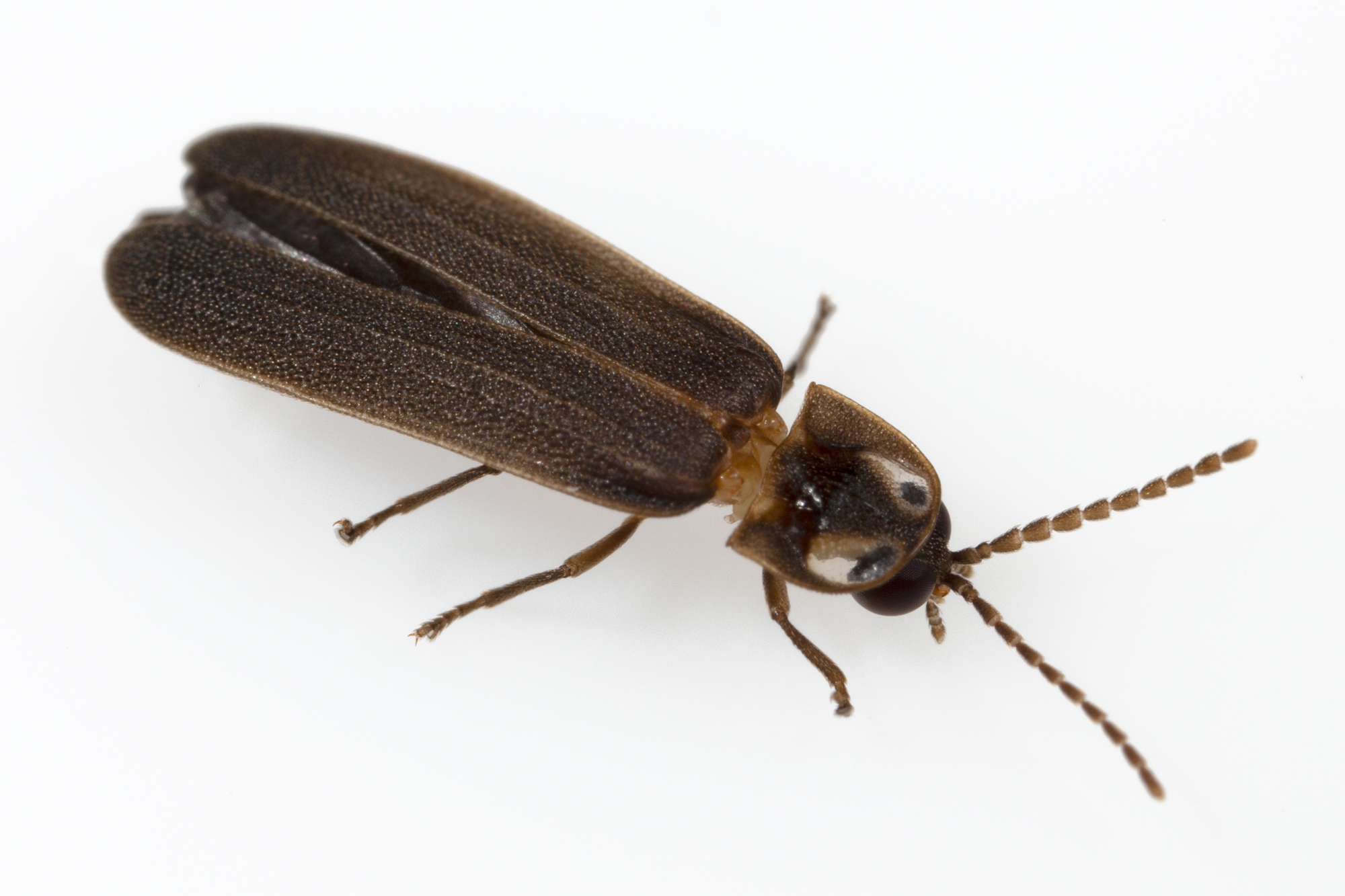
- Dorsal view of Phausis reticulata

Scientific classification
- Domain: Eukaryota
- Kingdom: Animalia
- Phylum: Arthropoda
- Class: Insecta
- Order: Coleoptera
- Suborder: Polyphaga
- Infraorder: Elateriformia
- Family: Lampyridae
- Subfamily: Lamprohizinae
- Genus: Phausis; LeConte, 1851

= Phausis =

Genus of beetles

Phausis is a genus of firefly beetles (family Lampyridae). These beetles are for the most part unimpressive in their appearance and behaviour, so have not drawn much study, and little is known about many of the species. Species in this genus are at least known from North America. Ten species are described in North America, ranging throughout much of the continent.

The genera Phausis and Lamprohiza are very similar and in need of revision; the delimitations between the two are not clear. Alternatively, Phausis may be paraphyletic and/or at least in part synonymous with Lamprohiza. The genus is traditionally placed in the tribe Photinini of the Lampyrinae, but at least the blue ghost firefly, Phausis reticulata does not seem to be particularly close to this group (or Lamprohiza for that matter) and might not even belong in the subfamily Lampyrinae.

== Description ==
Phausis males are small compared to many fireflies, ranging from about 3.0 to 8.5 mm (0.12 to 0.33 in). Most are brown to brown-black in colour and have transparent "window" spots in the front half of the pronotum. A key characteristic distinguishing adult male Phausis from most other firefly genera is the presence of a minute glassy bead at the tip of each antenna. Males have huge eyes. Most male Phausis are not luminescent, though males of Phausis reticulata emit a faint, constant glow.

Female Phausis are larviform and flightless, but bioluminescent, even if males of the same species are not.

== Species ==
- Phausis californica Fender, 1966
- Phausis dorothae Fender, 1961
- Phausis inaccensa LeConte, 1878
- Phausis luminosa Fender, 1966
- Phausis marina Fender, 1966
- Phausis nigra Hopping, 1937
- Phausis reticulata – blue ghost firefly
- Phausis rhombica Fender, 1961
- Phausis riversi (LeConte, 1884 (1885))
- Phausis skelleyi Fender, 1961
