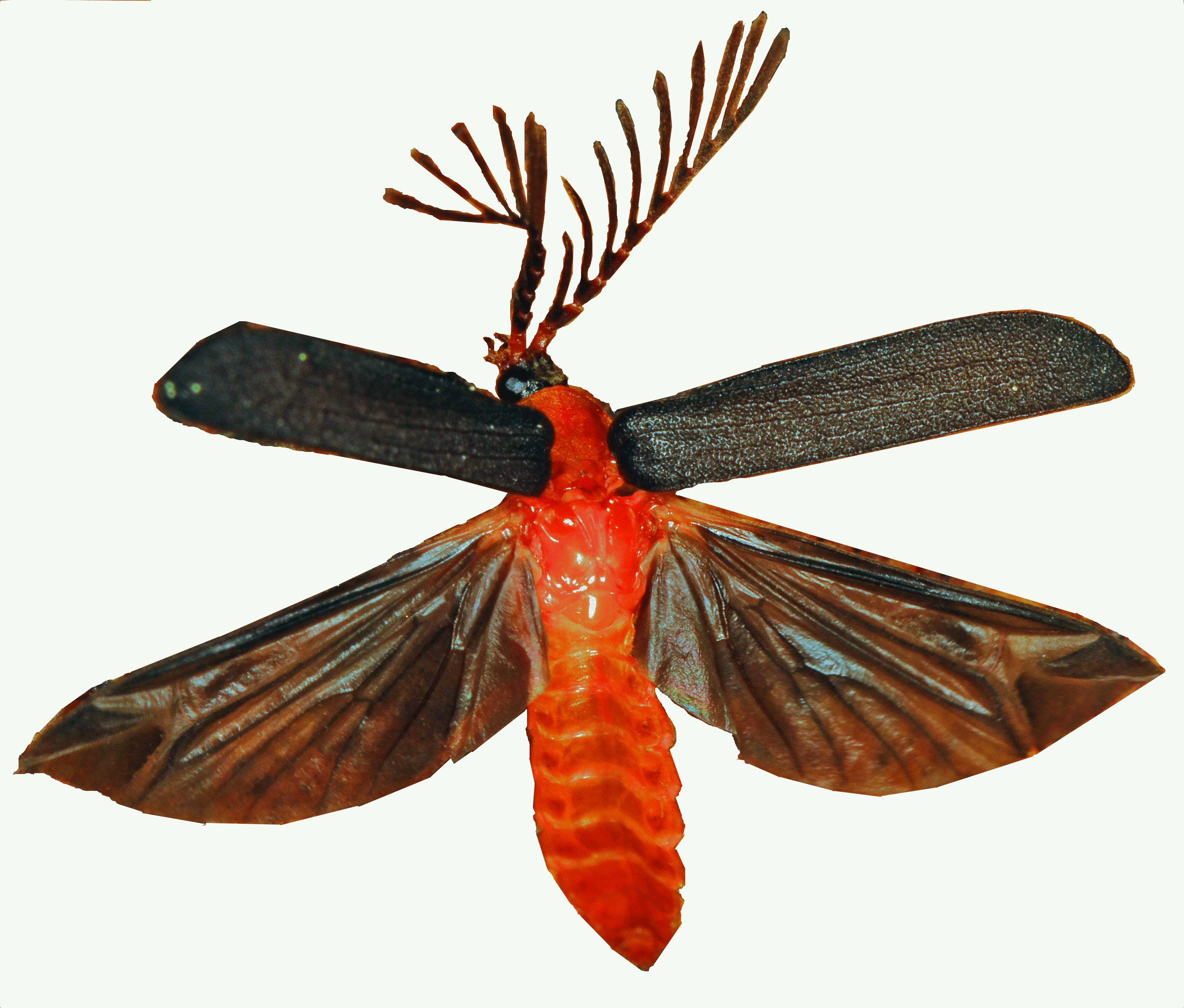

Scientific classification
- Kingdom: Animalia
- Phylum: Arthropoda
- Class: Insecta
- Order: Coleoptera
- Suborder: Polyphaga
- Infraorder: Elateriformia
- Family: Lampyridae
- Genus: Pterotus
- Species: P. obscuripennis

Binomial name
- Pterotus obscuripennis LeConte, 1859

= Pterotus obscuripennis =

Species of beetle

Pterotus obscuripennis, commonly known as the Douglas fir glowworm, is a species of firefly in the beetle family Lampyridae. It is found along the western coast of North America, from Washington to California.

== Description ==
Adult males are smaller (9.5-12 mm), alate, capable of flight, have an elaborate antenna morphology, and are totally non-luminous. Adult females are larger (~25-35 mm), fully larviform and flightless. They are cream to light golden brown in color and luminous with photo organs on the seventh and eighth abdominal segment. Larvae are largely black in color, with cream to white coloration in the spaces between the body segments, and are luminous and predatory on slugs.

== Feeding ==
The principle foods of the larvae is slugs and/or snails. A large part of the digestive process for larva is pre-oral: mandibles containing hollow centers are used to inject a brown fluid that is slightly alkaline, contains proteases, and observationally, likely contains a neurotoxin. When bitten, a slug writhes, secretes mucous, and tries to flee. The larva will bite the slug multiple times, causing the same response. Around 10 minutes after the first bite, the prey will become immobilized, still breathing and showing muscle response to pin-pricks. If the prey is bitten only once, it will still become immobilized and die within 30 hours. Almost always, the final bite when feeding is on/around the head of the prey. This final bite seems to completely stop all movement of the slug. When bitten in the head, the prey will die within 3 hours.

Once a slug is subdued, the larva normally tries to hide its meal and feed. Digestive enzymes are excreted onto the prey, which turns the prey into a soupy mixture that can then be eaten. This process is helped by the mechanical action of a small tooth on either mandible. After eating, a larva will enter a quiescent period where it remains hidden and lethargic for 2-20 days

Larvae often glow brightly when feeding. They can survive up to 3 months without food. Larvae have a caudal appendage that is used to clean themselves of a slug's mucous after subduing the prey and after eating. This appendage is mainly used for movement as well as anchoring themselves to snail's shell.
