= Phausis rhombica =

Conservation status
- Data Deficient (IUCN 3.1)

Scientific classification
- Kingdom: Animalia
- Phylum: Arthropoda
- Class: Insecta
- Order: Coleoptera
- Suborder: Polyphaga
- Infraorder: Elateriformia
- Family: Lampyridae
- Genus: Phausis
- Species: P. rhombica

Binomial name
- Phausis rhombica Fender in Hatch, 1962

Species of beetle

Phausis rhombica is a species of firefly in the beetle family Lampyridae. It is found in North America.
