= Cheguevaria =

Scientific classification
- Domain: Eukaryota
- Kingdom: Animalia
- Phylum: Arthropoda
- Class: Insecta
- Order: Coleoptera
- Suborder: Polyphaga
- Infraorder: Elateriformia
- Family: Lampyridae
- Subfamily: Cheguevariinae
- Genus: Cheguevaria; Kazantsev, 2006

Species
- See text

Genus of beetles

Cheguevaria is a genus of fireflies (family Lampyridae), and the sole member of the subfamily Cheguevariinae.

== Distribution ==
Cheguevaria are found in the Caribbean.

== Systematics and nomenclature ==
The genus Cheguevaria is of uncertain relationships, though possibly related to Amydetinae, and has been given placement as the sole member of its own subfamily, after previously being considered as incertae sedis within the Lampyridae. The genus name is in homage to Marxist revolutionary leader Che Guevara.

=== Species ===
- Cheguevaria angusta Kazantsev, 2006 from the Dominican Republic
- Cheguevaria taino Kazantsev, 2006 from Puerto Rico
- Cheguevaria montana Kazantsev, 2008 from Puerto Rico
