= Nyctocrepis monnei =

Scientific classification
- Kingdom: Animalia
- Phylum: Arthropoda
- Clade: Pancrustacea
- Class: Insecta
- Order: Coleoptera
- Suborder: Polyphaga
- Infraorder: Elateriformia
- Family: Lampyridae
- Genus: Nyctocrepis
- Species: N. monnei

Binomial name
- Nyctocrepis monnei Alexandre, Takiya & Silveira, 2026

Species of beetle

Nyctocrepis monnei is a species of beetle of the family Lampyridae. It is found in Brazil (Rio de Janeiro).

== Description ==
Adults reach a length of about 0.8–1.1 mm (0.031–0.043 in). The pronotum is dark brown, and darker at the pronotal disc, with a pair of vitreous spots at the anterolateral margins on the pronotal expansions. The pronotal external margins are often lighter. The basal half of the elytra is orangish‑yellow (with a fine transverse dark brown macula at the base) and the apical half is dark brown. The head, antennae, mouthparts, thorax, legs and abdomen are dark brown. They are covered by short brown setae and punctures which are evenly distributed on the dorsum and venter.

== Etymology ==
The species is named in honour of Dr. Miguel Monné.
