= Pollaclasis =

Scientific classification
- Domain: Eukaryota
- Kingdom: Animalia
- Phylum: Arthropoda
- Class: Insecta
- Order: Coleoptera
- Suborder: Polyphaga
- Infraorder: Elateriformia
- Family: Lampyridae
- Genus: Pollaclasis; Newman, 1838

Genus of beetles

Pollaclasis is a genus of fireflies in the beetle family Lampyridae. There is one described species in Pollaclasis, P. bifaria. Pollaclasis is most closely related to Pterotus, and may someday become included within the Pterotinae subfamily.
