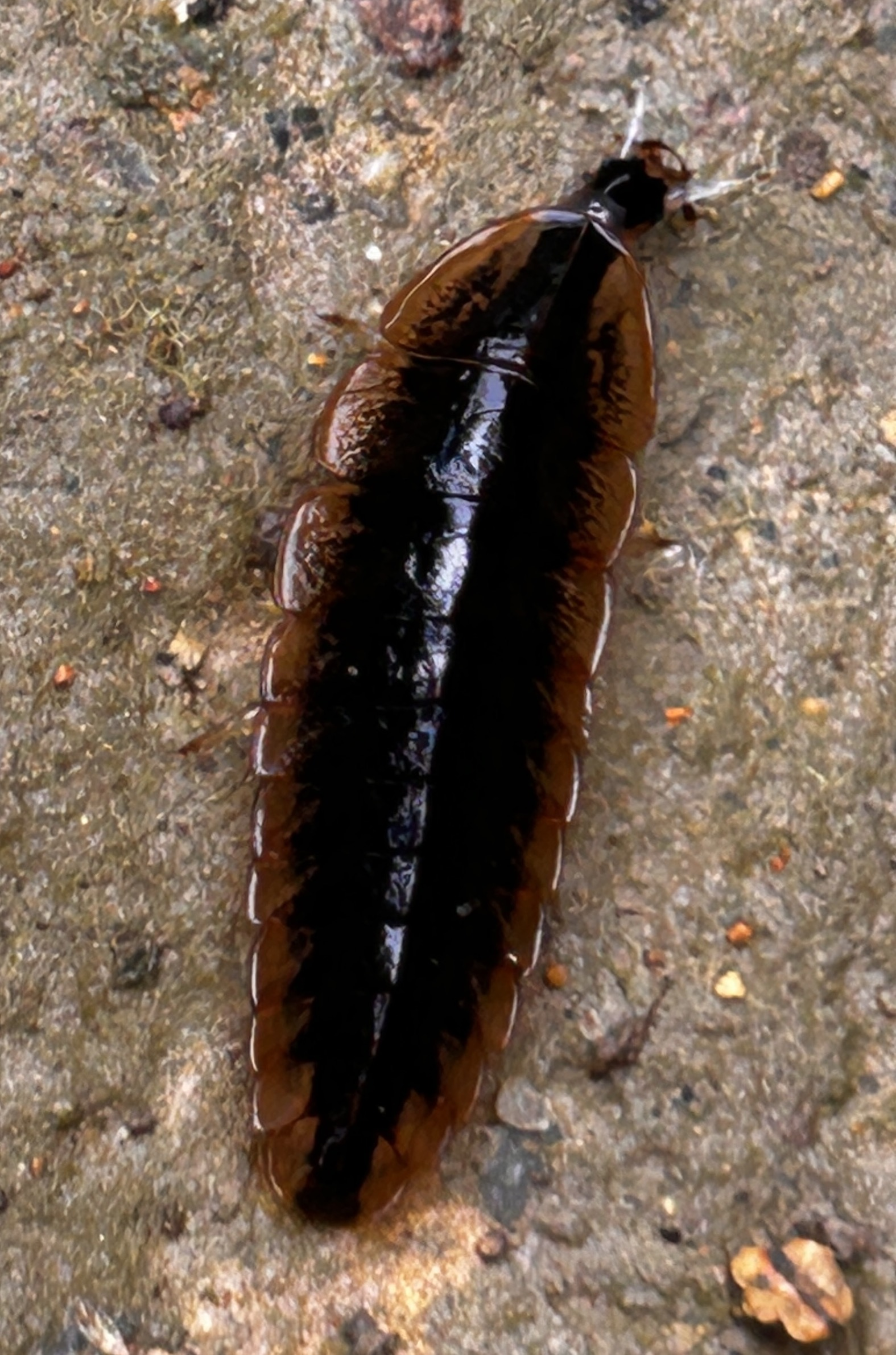

Scientific classification
- Kingdom: Animalia
- Phylum: Arthropoda
- Clade: Pancrustacea
- Class: Insecta
- Order: Coleoptera
- Suborder: Polyphaga
- Infraorder: Elateriformia
- Family: Lampyridae
- Genus: Lamprigera
- Species: L. taimoshana

Binomial name
- Lamprigera taimoshana Yiu, 2017

= Lamprigera taimoshana =

Species of beetle

Lamprigera taimoshana, the Tai Mo Shan elephant firefly, endemic to Hong Kong, is part of the poorly resolved Lamprigera genus of fireflies or glow-worms.

Living in montane forest and grassland above 600m, it has only been recorded on some of the highest peaks of Hong Kong such as Tai Mo Shan and Sunset Peak.
