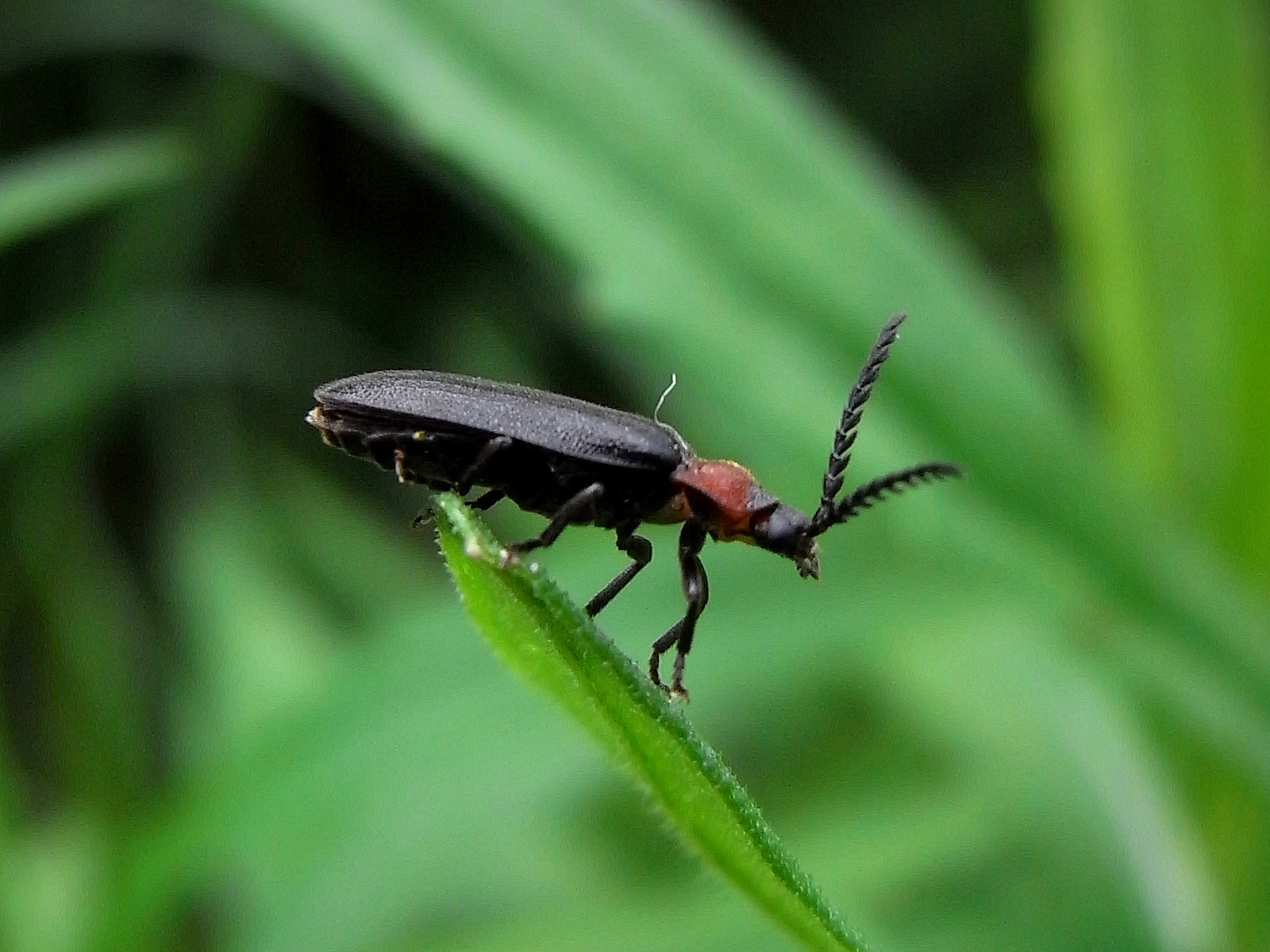
- Cyphonocerus ruficollis

Scientific classification
- Domain: Eukaryota
- Kingdom: Animalia
- Phylum: Arthropoda
- Class: Insecta
- Order: Coleoptera
- Suborder: Polyphaga
- Infraorder: Elateriformia
- Family: Lampyridae
- Subfamily: Cyphonocerinae; Crowson, 1972
- Genus: Cyphonocerus; Kiesenwetter, 1879

= Cyphonocerus =

Genus of fireflies

Cyphonocerus is a genus of fireflies (Lampyridae) within the monotypic subfamily Cyphonocerinae.

== Species ==
The genus contains 15 species from Asia:

- Cyphonocerus harmandi
- Cyphonocerus hwadongensis
- Cyphonocerus inelegans
- Cyphonocerus jenniferae
- Cyphonocerus melanopterus
- Cyphonocerus marginatus
- Cyphonocerus nigrithorax
- Cyphonocerus okinawanus
- Cyphonocerus ruficollis
- Cyphonocerus sanguineus
- Cyphonocerus sylvicola
- Cyphonocerus taiwanus
- Cyphonocerus triangulus
- Cyphonocerus watarii
- Cyphonocerus yayeyamensis
