= Psilocladus =

Scientific classification
- Kingdom: Animalia
- Phylum: Arthropoda
- Class: Insecta
- Order: Coleoptera
- Suborder: Polyphaga
- Infraorder: Elateriformia
- Family: Lampyridae
- Subfamily: Psilocladinae; McDermott, 1964
- Genus: Psilocladus; Blanchard in Brullé, 1845

Genus of beetles

Psilocladus is the only genus of the Psilocladinae subfamily of fireflies. Species in this genus are found primarily in South America and Japan.

It contains 45 species:

- P. albomarginatus Pic, 1937
- P. apicalis Kirsch, 1865
- P. atricornis Pic, 1925
- P. atromaculatus Pic, 1930
- P. aztecus Gutiérrez-Carranza, Zaragoza-Caballero and Keller, 2025
- P. basalis Pic, 1925
- P. bicoloripes Pic, 1930
- P. blanchardi E. Olivier, 1909
- P. bogotensis Pic, 1911
- P. boliviensis Pic, 1930
- P. breveramulosus Pic, 1937
- P. calvus Kirsch, 1870
- P. cancinoi Gutiérrez-Carranza, Zaragoza-Caballero and Keller, 2025
- P. capillatus E. Olivier, 1888
- P. claveri Pic, 1925
- P. costae Vaz, Silveira and Rosa, 2020
- P. fasciatus Pic, 1927
- P. formosus E. Olivier, 1885
- P. grandis E. Olivier, 1888
- P. guerini E. Olivier, 1885
- P. guyanensis Pic, 1927
- P. haemorrhoidalis E. Olivier, 1909
- P. impexus E. Olivier in Wytsman, 1907
- P. inauditus E. Olivier, 1885
- P. lemoulti Pic, 1937
- P. lineolatus E. Olivier, 1885
- P. marginatus Lewis, 1895
- P. marginellus E. Olivier, 1888
- P. melas E. Olivier, 1885
- P. miltoderus Blanchard in Brullé, 1845
- P. minutus Pic, 1937
- P. nebulosus E. Olivier, 1885
- P. nevermanni Pic, 1937
- P. noveloi Gutiérrez-Carranza, Zaragoza-Caballero and Keller, 2025
- P. peruvianus (Kirsch, 1873)
- P. pici E. Olivier in Wytsman, 1907
- P. pulcher E. Olivier, 1885
- P. scutellaris Gorham, 1881
- P. setosus E. Olivier in Wytsman, 1907
- P. sigillatus E. Olivier, 1907
- P. silphoides Gorham, 1880
- P. stolatus Gorham, 1881
- P. suppletus E. Olivier, 1909
- P. suturalis E. Olivier, 1885
- P. testaceus Pic, 1925
