= Photoctus =

Scientific classification
- Kingdom: Animalia
- Phylum: Arthropoda
- Clade: Pancrustacea
- Class: Insecta
- Order: Coleoptera
- Suborder: Polyphaga
- Infraorder: Elateriformia
- Family: Lampyridae
- Subfamily: Amydetinae
- Genus: Photoctus; McDermott, 1961

Species
- Photoctus boliviae McDermott, 1961; Photoctus galbinus Campello-Gonçalves, Roza, Mermudes and Silveira in Campello-Gonçalves et al., 2025; Photoctus tenebrosus Campello-Gonçalves, Roza, Mermudes and Silveira in Campello-Gonçalves et al., 2025

Genus of beetles

Photoctus is a genus of fireflies in the family Lampyridae. There are 3 described species in this genus.
