= Chespirito (beetle) =

Scientific classification
- Kingdom: Animalia
- Phylum: Arthropoda
- Clade: Pancrustacea
- Class: Insecta
- Order: Coleoptera
- Suborder: Polyphaga
- Infraorder: Elateriformia
- Family: Lampyridae
- Subfamily: Chespiritoinae; Ferreira, Keller & Branham, 2020
- Genus: Chespirito; Ferreira, Keller, & Branham, 2020

Species
- C. ballantyneae Ferreira, Keller and Branham, 2020; C. costae Ferreira, Keller and Ivie, 2022; C. hintoni Ferreira, Keller and Ivie, 2022; C. lloydi Ferreira, Keller and Branham, 2020; C. milleri Ferreira, Keller and Ivie, 2022; C. zaragozai Ferreira, Keller and Branham, 2020

Genus of beetles

Chespirito is a genus of fireflies (family Lampyridae). They are the type genus and sole constituent of the subfamily Chespiritoinae. This genus is somewhat unusual among fireflies in a complete lack of bioluminescent organs in the adults.

== Distribution ==
Chespirito is only known to occur in Mexico but is hypothesized to occur in nearby countries, such as Guatemala, Belize and Honduras.

== Systematics and nomenclature ==
The genus Chespirito is not closely related to any other firefly lineages, and is given placement as the sole member of its own subfamily. The genus name is in homage to the Mexican actor Roberto Gómez Bolaños, commonly known by his stage name Chespirito, or "Little Shakespeare".
