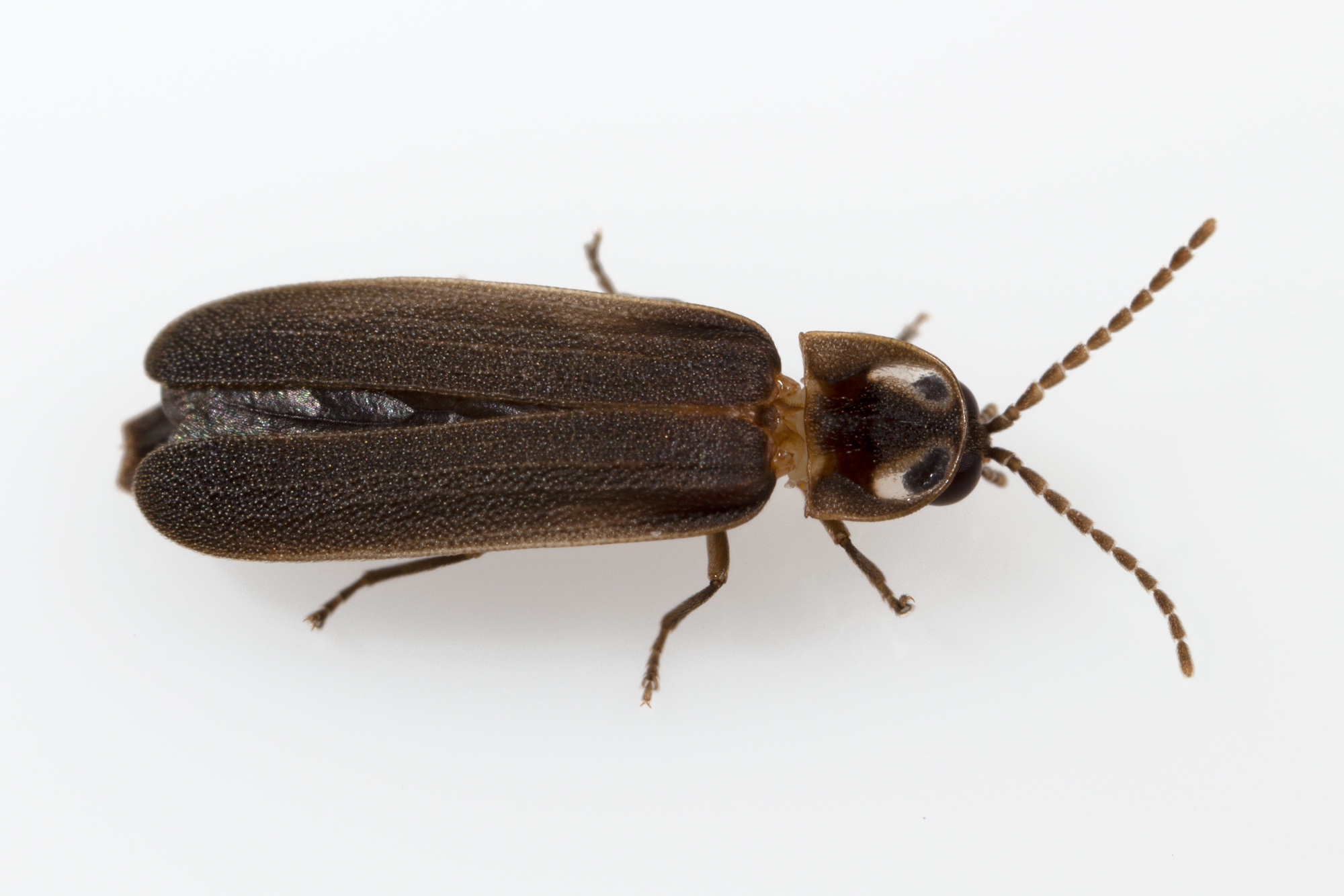
- Blue ghost firefly, Phausis reticulata (Say, 1825), from eastern Kentucky

Scientific classification
- Kingdom: Animalia
- Phylum: Arthropoda
- Clade: Pancrustacea
- Class: Insecta
- Order: Coleoptera
- Suborder: Polyphaga
- Infraorder: Elateriformia
- Family: Lampyridae
- Genus: Phausis
- Species: P. reticulata

Binomial name
- Phausis reticulata (Say, 1825)

= Phausis reticulata =

Species of beetle

Phausis reticulata, commonly referred to as the blue ghost is a species of firefly found in the eastern and central United States. The species is common in the southern Appalachians, and can be seen in Great Smoky Mountains National Park, the Chattahoochee National Forest, as well as North Carolina's DuPont State Forest, the Pisgah National Forest, and the Green River Gamelands in Henderson, Polk, and Transylvania Counties.

== Description ==
P. reticulata is a tiny to medium-sized beetle. The males of this all-brown species are about 6–9 mm (0.24–0.35 in) long, have a short second antennomere (compared to the third) as well as large eyes. Unlike many firefly species found in the eastern and central United States, P. reticulata males display a steady glow, instead of a species-specific flashing pattern. The light emitted by "blue ghost" fireflies appears to the human eye as blueish-white when observed at night from a distance, but bright green when examined at close range. This discrepancy in the observed color may be due to the Purkinje effect. Males are capable of controlling each light segment independently and can vary the intensity of their glow.

Female blue ghosts are wingless, unable to fly, and they are yellow and paedomorphic, remaining in larval form through adulthood. They are also tiny, measuring only about 4–9 mm (0.16–0.35 in) long.

== Life cycle ==
=== Adults ===
The blue ghost fireflies' ideal conditions for mating season include warm and moist forest areas that are surrounded by spongy leaf litter. The male fireflies fly a few feet off the ground, spotting glowing females. The females glow continuously from 4 to 9 spots on her body so they can be spotted by the males. Females can mate more than one time.

=== Eggs and larvae ===
Once a female lays her clutch of 20 to 30 eggs, she guards them until she dies in one to two weeks. The eggs hatch approximately 4 to 5 weeks after the mother dies. The larvae are extremely tiny, approximately 0.05 in (1 – 2 mm) and are bioluminescent.

== Range ==
P. reticulata populations have been recorded in the southern Appalachian Mountains and piedmont areas of Georgia, Alabama, South Carolina, North Carolina, and Tennessee, with some isolated pockets in northern Florida.

== Habitat ==
Adults are found in a variety of habitats, including dry and moist woods, near water, and along high, dry ridges.

== In culture ==
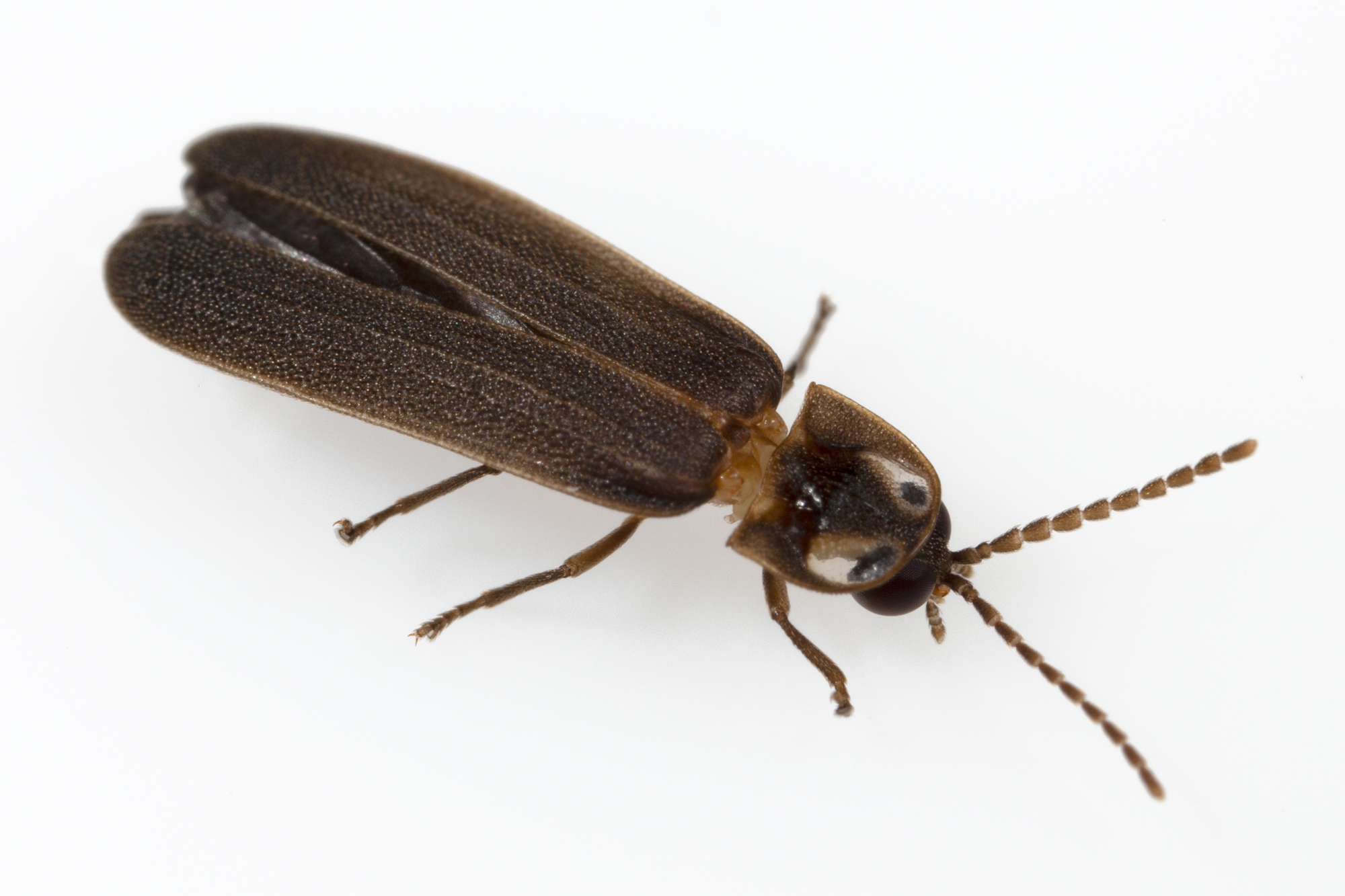
Blue ghost firefly, Phausis reticulata (Say, 1825), from eastern Kentucky

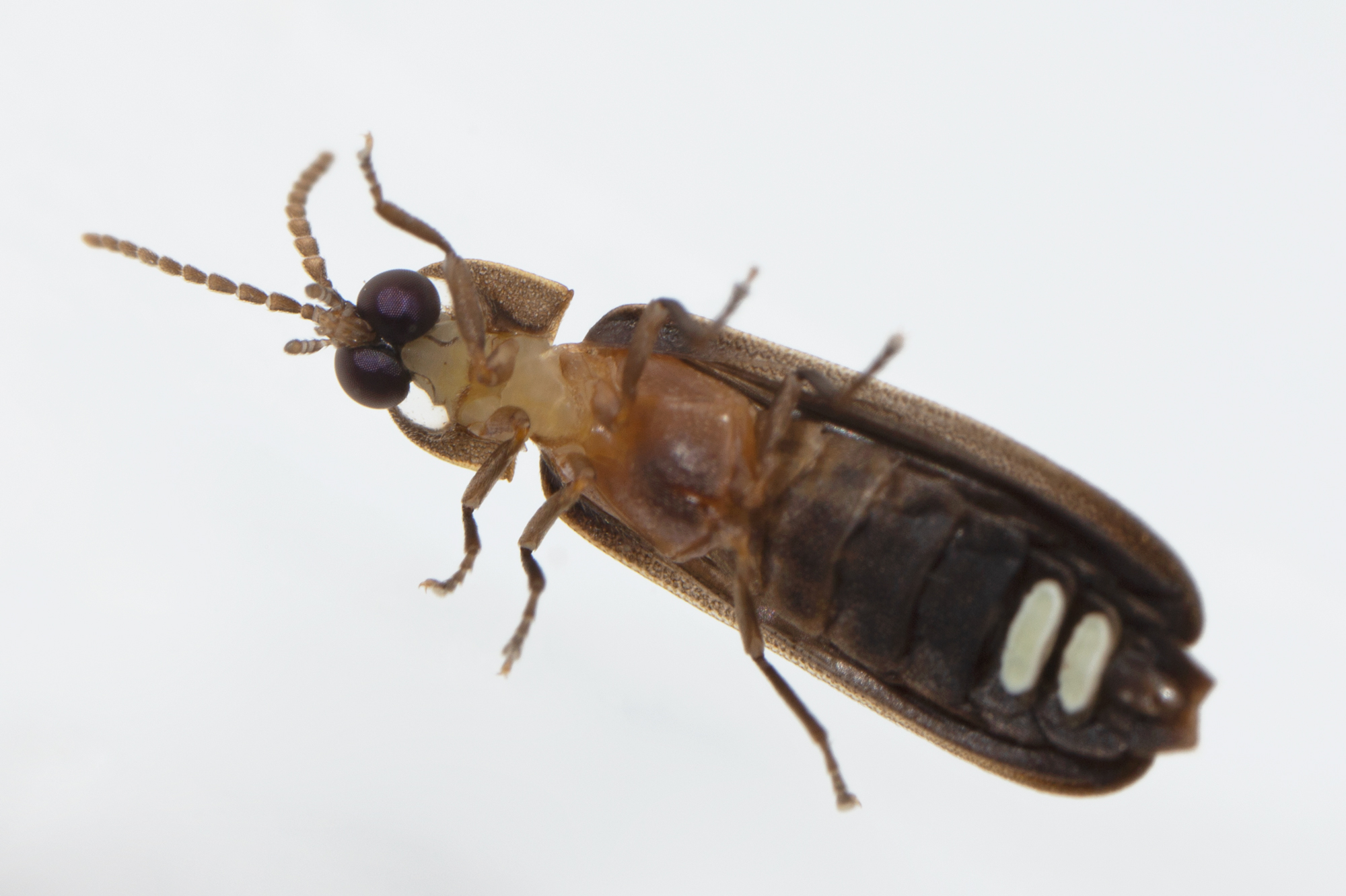
Blue ghost firefly, Phausis reticulata (Say, 1825), from eastern Kentucky

A class of lunar landers by Firefly Aerospace is named "Blue Ghost" after this species.
