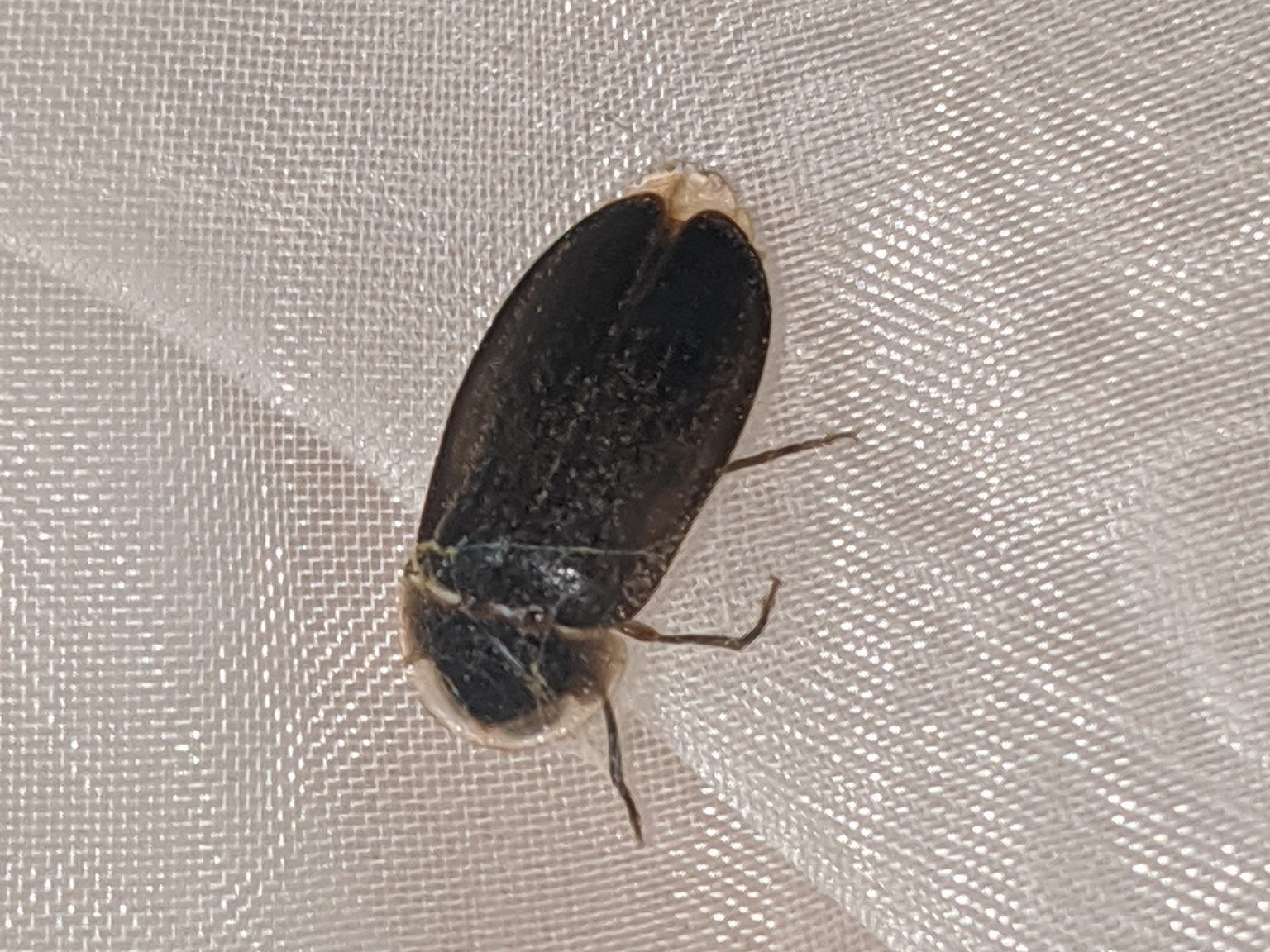
- Lamprigera yunnana

Scientific classification
- Kingdom: Animalia
- Phylum: Arthropoda
- Class: Insecta
- Order: Coleoptera
- Suborder: Polyphaga
- Infraorder: Elateriformia
- Family: Lampyridae
- Subfamily: Lampyrinae
- Genus: Lamprigera; Motschulsky, 1853

Synonyms
- Lamprophorus Gemminger & Harold, 1869

= Lamprigera =

Genus of beetles

Lamprigera is a poorly resolved genus of fireflies or glow-worms in the subfamily Lampyrinae, possibly placed in tribe Photinini. Species of the genus Lamprigera are found in Asia.

== Species ==
The Global Biodiversity Information Facility lists:

- Lamprigera angustior Fairmaire, 1886
- Lamprigera boyei Motschulsky, 1853
- Lamprigera crassus Gorham, 1880
- Lamprigera diffinis Walker, 1858
- Lamprigera lutosipennis Fairmaire, 1897
- Lamprigera marusii Pic, 1955
- Lamprigera minor E.Olivier, 1885
- Lamprigera morator (E.Olivier, 1891)
- Lamprigera nepalensis (Hope, 1831)
- Lamprigera nitens E.Olivier, 1885
- Lamprigera nitidicollis (Fairmaire, 1881)
- Lamprigera scutatus Fairmaire, 1897
- Lamprigera taimoshana Yiu, 2017
- Lamprigera tarda (Gorham, 1895)
- Lamprigera tenebrosa (Walker, 1858)
- Lamprigera yunnana (Fairmaire, 1897)
