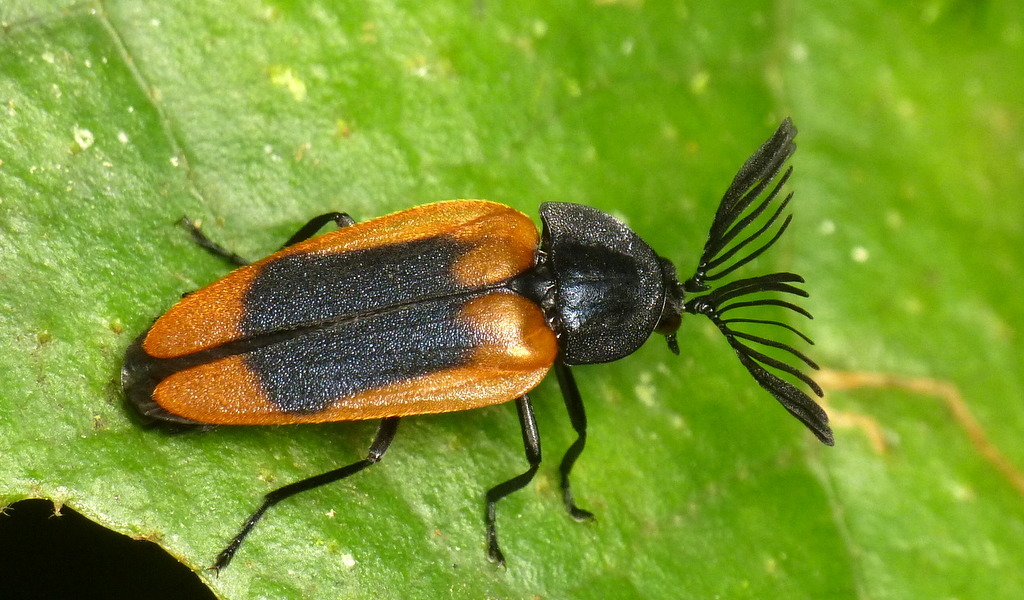

Scientific classification
- Domain: Eukaryota
- Kingdom: Animalia
- Phylum: Arthropoda
- Class: Insecta
- Order: Coleoptera
- Suborder: Polyphaga
- Infraorder: Elateriformia
- Family: Lampyridae
- Subfamily: Lampyrinae
- Genus: Cladodes; Solier, 1849

Synonyms
- Nyctocrepis Motschulsky, 1853 Rhipidophorus Solier in Gay, 1849 (non Gistl, 1847: preoccupied)

= Cladodes =

Genus of beetles

In botany, "Cladodes" may refer to a synonym of the genus Alchornea or to the plural of "cladode".

Cladodes is a genus of firefly beetles.

It used to be included in the subfamily Amydetinae, which is probably a highly artificial paraphyletic assemblage however. Thus, the genus is moved to the Lampyrinae for the time being.

Species within this genus include:

- Cladodes flabellatus Solier in Gay, 1849
- Cladodes malleri Pic, 1935
