= Lamprohizinae =

Scientific classification
- Kingdom: Animalia
- Phylum: Arthropoda
- Class: Insecta
- Order: Coleoptera
- Suborder: Polyphaga
- Infraorder: Elateriformia
- Family: Lampyridae
- Subfamily: Lamprohizinae; Kazantsev, 2010

Genera
- Eolamprohiza Kazanstev, 2024; Lamprohiza Motschulsky, 1853; Phausis LeConte, 1851

Synonyms
- Lamprohizini (Kazantsev, 2010)

Subfamily of fireflies

The Lamprohizinae are a subfamily of fireflies (Lampyridae) containing 3 genera and 23 known species.
