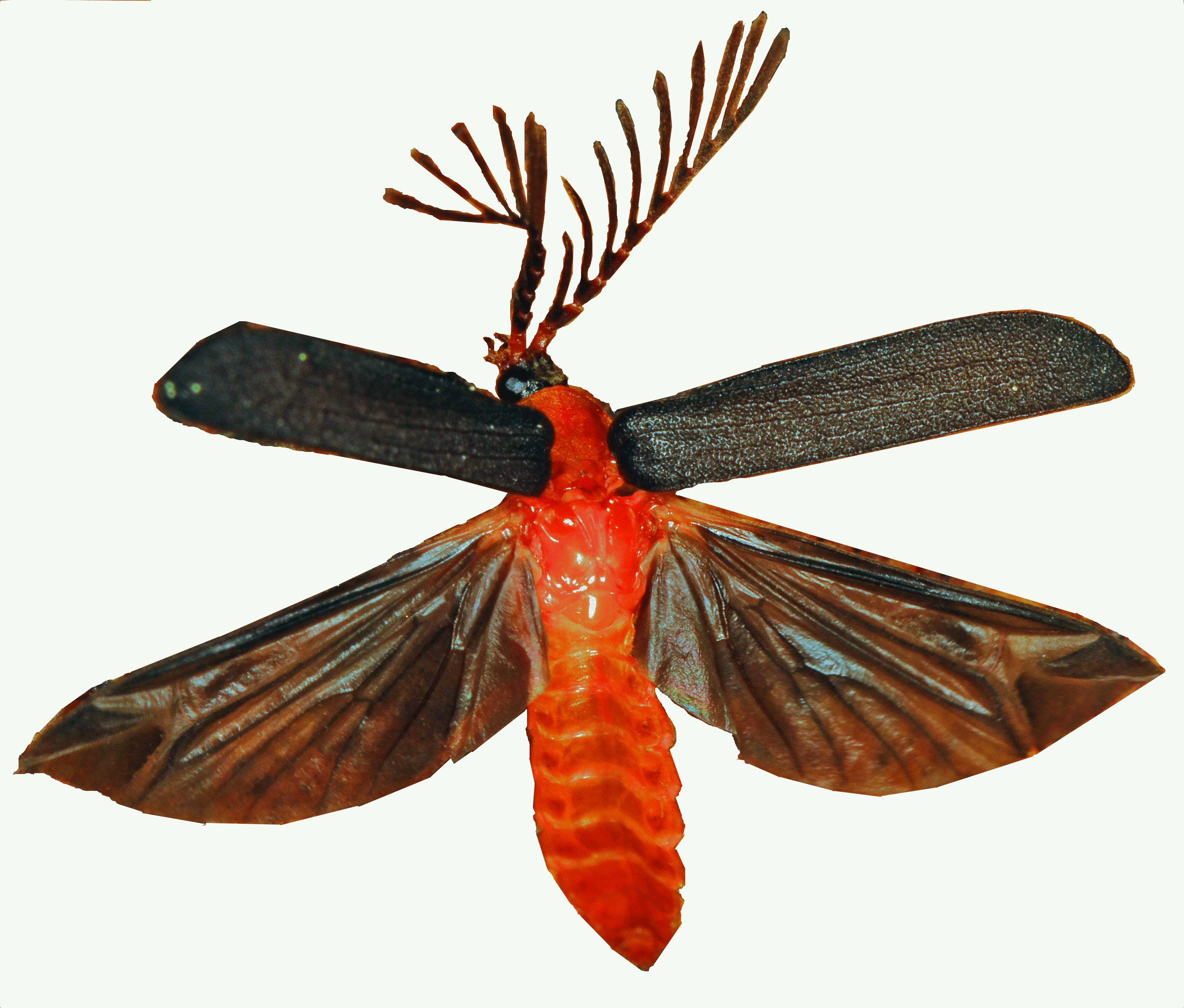
- Pterotus obscuripennis

Scientific classification
- Kingdom: Animalia
- Phylum: Arthropoda
- Clade: Pancrustacea
- Class: Insecta
- Order: Coleoptera
- Suborder: Polyphaga
- Infraorder: Elateriformia
- Family: Lampyridae
- Subfamily: Pterotinae
- Genus: Pterotus; LeConte, 1859

Species
- Pterotus curticornis Chemsak, 1978; Pterotus obscuripennis LeConte, 1859

= Pterotus =

Small genus of fireflies

Pterotus is the sole genus in the firefly subfamily Pterotinae. It is characterized by flabellate antennae with three to ten antennomeres and rami, or branches, of the antennae longer than the antennomeres.

Pterotus is found in chaparral habitats on the western coast of North America and in deserts as far east as Jeff Davis County, Texas. Adult females are larviform and both emit pheromones and glow to attract non-luminescent males. While there are two described species in Pterotus, whether they are truly separate species is yet unclear.
