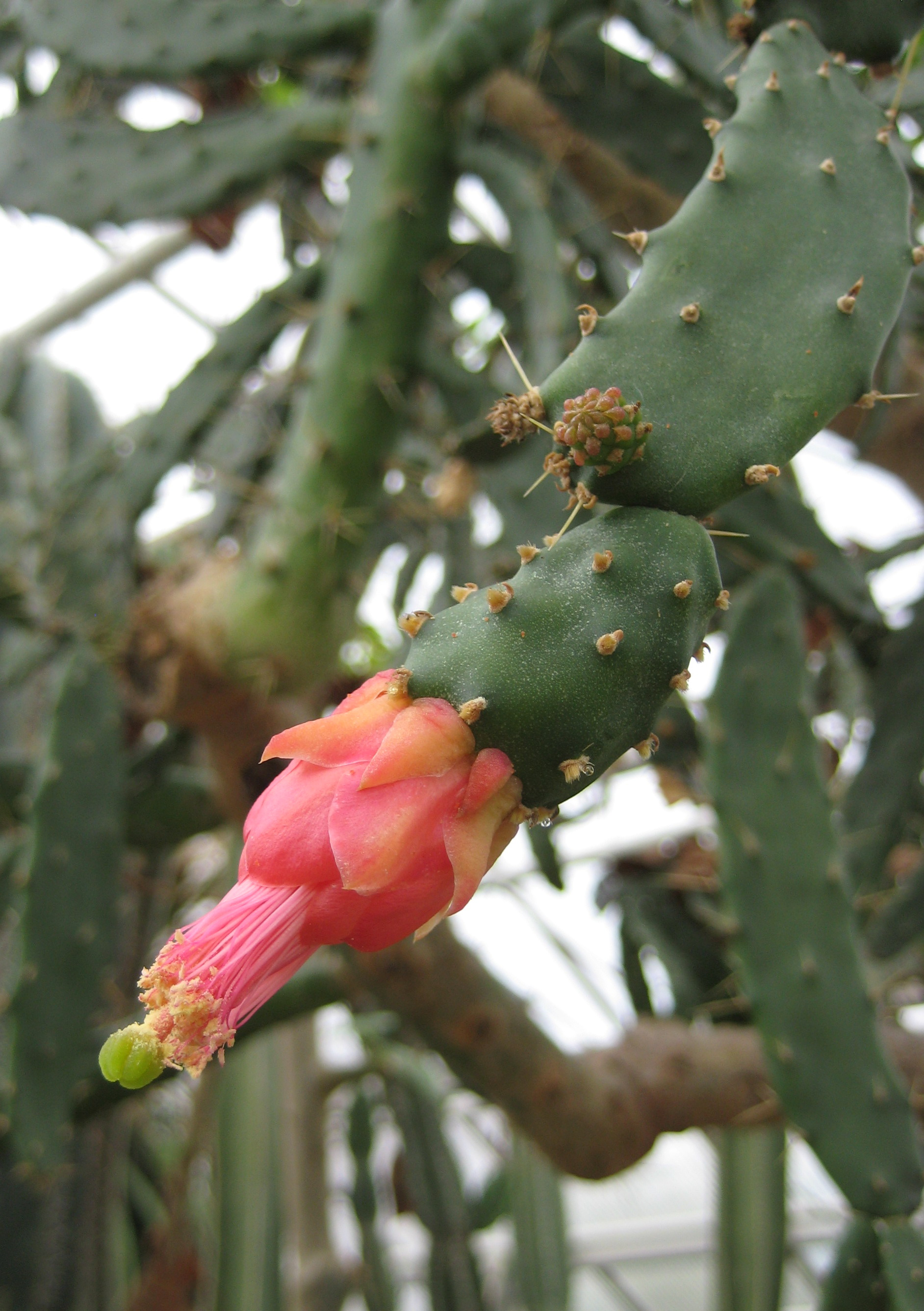

Scientific classification
- Kingdom: Plantae
- Clade: Tracheophytes
- Clade: Angiosperms
- Clade: Eudicots
- Order: Caryophyllales
- Family: Cactaceae
- Genus: Opuntia
- Species: O. dejecta

Binomial name
- Opuntia dejecta Salm-Dyck

Synonyms
- Nopalea dejecta (Salm-Dyck) Salm-Dyck; Opuntia diffusa Pfeiff.; Opuntia horizontalis Pfeiff.

= Opuntia dejecta =

Species of plant

Opuntia dejecta is a species of plant in the cactus family. They are listed in cites appendix ii. Flowers are visited by the broad-billed hummingbird.

== Source ==
This article incorporates text from a free content work. Licensed under CC0 (license statement/permission). Text taken from Nopalea dejecta. Encyclopedia of Life.
