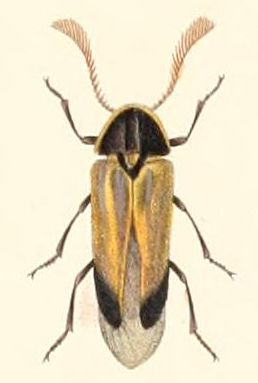

Scientific classification
- Kingdom: Animalia
- Phylum: Arthropoda
- Class: Insecta
- Order: Coleoptera
- Suborder: Polyphaga
- Infraorder: Elateriformia
- Family: Lampyridae
- Subfamily: Amydetinae; E. Olivier in Wytsman, 1907

= Amydetinae =

Subfamily of fireflies

Amydetinae is an exclusively Neotropical subfamily of fireflies (Lampyridae), spanning 7 genera and over 50 species. Fireflies in this subfamily have antennae composed of 20–40 segments, flabellate from the third segment onward, with long, narrow, pubescent or finely villose branches. The prothorax is transverse with arcuate posterior angles, and light-producing organs occupy the final three abdominal segments.

== Taxonomy ==
Throughout much of the 20th century, the taxonomic rank and scope of Amydetinae were applied inconsistently. Some authors maintained it as a subfamily, while others reduced it to a tribe (Amydetini) within broader subfamilies, reflecting uncertainty about its relationships within Lampyridae and the limited comparative material available at the time.

Further comparative studies of adult morphology and increasing attention to larval characters eventually highlighted the distinctiveness of the group, setting the stage for its reassessment in modern phylogenetic frameworks. With the addition of modern molecular analysis, this work laid the foundation for a firm validation of Amydetinae as a distinct subfamily.

== Genera ==
Amydetinae contains the following genera:

- Amydetes Hoffmannsegg in Illiger, 1807
- Amydreades Campello-Gonçalves, Roza, Mermudes and Silveira in Campello-Gonçalves et al., 2025
- Dandaria Campello-Gonçalves, Roza, Mermudes and Silveira in Campello-Gonçalves et al., 2025
- Magnoculus McDermott, 1966
- Marighellia Campello-Gonçalves, Roza, Mermudes and Silveira in Campello-Gonçalves et al., 2025
- Memoan Silveira and Mermudes, 2013
- Photoctus McDermott, 1961
