= List of Lucidota species =

This is a list of 160 species in Lucidota, a genus of fireflies in the family Lampyridae.

== Lucidota species ==
- Lucidota albicollis (Blanchard in Brullé, 1846)^{i c g}
- Lucidota albocincta (Pic, 1940)^{i c g}
- Lucidota albocornuta (Pic, 1940)^{i c g}
- Lucidota amabilis (Gorham, 1880)^{i c g}
- Lucidota angustata (Motschulsky, 1854)^{i c}
- Lucidota antennata Laporte, 1833^{i c g}
- Lucidota antonioi Pic, 1940^{i c g}
- Lucidota apicalis Gorham, 1880^{i c g}
- Lucidota apicicornis Gorham, 1880^{i c g}
- Lucidota apicipennis (Pic, 1927)^{i c g}
- Lucidota appendiculata (Germar, 1824)^{i c g}
- Lucidota approximans E. Olivier, 1885^{i c g}
- Lucidota argentina (Pic, 1928)^{i c g}
- Lucidota armata (Gorham, 1884)^{i c g}
- Lucidota atra (G. Olivier, 1790)^{i c g b} (black firefly)
- Lucidota audax E. Olivier, 1896^{i c g}
- Lucidota aurantiaca (Pic, 1929)^{i c g}
- Lucidota baeri (Pic, 1927)^{i c g}
- Lucidota banghaasi Pic, 1930^{i c g}
- Lucidota banoni Laporte, 1833^{i c g}
- Lucidota basalis Pic, 1930^{i c g}
- Lucidota bella Gorham, 1880^{i c g}
- Lucidota bicellonycha McDermott, 1958^{i c g}
- Lucidota bicolor Kirsch, 1873^{i c g}
- Lucidota binotata (Pic, 1929)^{i c}
- Lucidota binotatens McDermott, 1966^{i c g}
- Lucidota bipartita Pic, 1927^{i c g}
- Lucidota blanchardi E. Olivier, 1899^{i c g}
- Lucidota bogotensis (Pic, 1931)^{i c}
- Lucidota boliviana (Pic, 1927)^{i c g}
- Lucidota bruneri Mutchler, 1923^{i c g}
- Lucidota caucaensis Pic, 1940^{i c g}
- Lucidota chevrolati Mutchler, 1923^{i c g}
- Lucidota chiriquiana Gorham, 1884^{i c g}
- Lucidota cincta (Motschulsky, 1854)^{i c}
- Lucidota clermonti Pic, 1940^{i c g}
- Lucidota comitata Gorham, 1884^{i c g}
- Lucidota complanata Gorham, 1884^{i c g}
- Lucidota compressicornis (Fabricius, 1801)^{i c g}
- Lucidota concors E. Olivier, 1909^{i c g}
- Lucidota conformis E. Olivier, 1907^{i c g}
- Lucidota conradti (Pic, 1940)^{i c}
- Lucidota costata Pic, 1930^{i c g}
- Lucidota cucullata E. Olivier, 1896^{i c g}
- Lucidota dejeani Lucas, 1859^{i c g}
- Lucidota diaphanura Gorham, 1881^{i c g}
- Lucidota difformis Gorham, 1884^{i c g}
- Lucidota dilaticornis (Motschulsky, 1854)^{i c g}
- Lucidota discivittata Pic, 1943^{i c g}
- Lucidota discoidea McDermott, 1966^{i c g}
- Lucidota discolor Gorham, 1881^{i c g}
- Lucidota dissimilis E. Olivier, 1909^{i c g}
- Lucidota duplicata E. Olivier, 1910^{i c g}
- Lucidota elapsa E. Olivier in Wytsman, 1907^{i c g}
- Lucidota elongata (Blanchard in Brullé, 1846)^{i c g}
- Lucidota emerita E. Olivier, 1910^{i c g}
- Lucidota eucera E. Olivier in Wytsman, 1907^{i c g}
- Lucidota fenestrata Gorham, 1884^{i c g}
- Lucidota flabellicornis (Fabricius, 1781)^{i c g}
- Lucidota flavipes (Motschulsky, 1854)^{i c g}
- Lucidota fraudata E. Olivier, 1908^{i c g}
- Lucidota fulgurans Gorham, 1880^{i c g}
- Lucidota fulvotincta Mutchler, 1923^{i c g}
- Lucidota fuscata Gorham, 1884^{i c g}
- Lucidota geniculata Pic, 1930^{i c g}
- Lucidota gounelli (Pic, 1940)^{i c g}
- Lucidota grandjeani (Pic, 1940)^{i c g}
- Lucidota heterocera E. Olivier, 1910^{i c g}
- Lucidota heteroclita E. Olivier in Wytsman, 1907^{i c g}
- Lucidota heynei Pic, 1941^{i c g}
- Lucidota hickeri Pic, 1940^{i c g}
- Lucidota immemor E. Olivier, 1909^{i c g}
- Lucidota inaperta E. Olivier, 1886^{i c g}
- Lucidota inapicalis Pic, 1930^{i c g}
- Lucidota incompta Gorham, 1884^{i c g}
- Lucidota ingloria E. Olivier, 1899^{i c g}
- Lucidota insignita E. Olivier, 1911^{i c g}
- Lucidota interrupta (Pic, 1927)^{i c g}
- Lucidota invida (E. Olivier, 1910)^{i c g}
- Lucidota jucunda (E. Olivier, 1888)^{i c g}
- Lucidota klugii (Motschulsky, 1853)^{i c g}
- Lucidota latealba (Pic, 1927)^{i c g}
- Lucidota laticornis Pic, 1943^{i c g}
- Lucidota latior Pic, 1930^{i c g}
- Lucidota lecontei (Kirsch, 1873)^{i c}
- Lucidota limbata Gorham, 1880^{i c g}
- Lucidota liturata E. Olivier, 1907^{i c g}
- Lucidota lunata (Motschulsky, 1854)^{i c g}
- Lucidota lunulata (Blanchard in Brullé, 1846)^{i c}
- Lucidota luteicollis (LeConte, 1878)^{i c g b}
- Lucidota luteohumeralis Pic, 1940^{i c g}
- Lucidota macrescens E. Olivier, 1909^{i c g}
- Lucidota malleri Pic, 1935^{i c g}
- Lucidota marginicollis Lucas, 1859^{i c g}
- Lucidota mellicula E. Olivier in Wytsman, 1907^{i c g}
- Lucidota misera E. Olivier, 1896^{i c g}
- Lucidota monacha E. Olivier, 1911^{i c g}
- Lucidota nobilis E. Olivier in Wytsman, 1907^{i c g}
- Lucidota oblongonotata E. Olivier, 1886^{i c g}
- Lucidota oculata E. Olivier, 1886^{i c g}
- Lucidota olivieri Pic, 1938^{i c g}
- Lucidota ornata E. Olivier, 1909^{i c g}
- Lucidota osculatii (Guérin-Méneville, 1855)^{i c g}
- Lucidota pallidicollis (Blanchard in Brullé, 1846)^{i c g}
- Lucidota pallipes McDermott, 1966^{i c g}
- Lucidota parallela (Pic, 1927)^{i c}
- Lucidota parilis E. Olivier, 1909^{i c g}
- Lucidota parvicollis E. Olivier, 1885^{i c g}
- Lucidota pectinata (Fabricius, 1775)^{i c g}
- Lucidota pennata Dejean, 1837^{i c g}
- Lucidota perpusilla E. Olivier, 1885^{i c g}
- Lucidota peruviana (Pic, 1927)^{i c g}
- Lucidota phyllocera (Wiedemann, 1821)^{i c g}
- Lucidota planicornis (Fabricius, 1801)^{i c g}
- Lucidota plaumanni Pic, 1939^{i c g}
- Lucidota premarginalis Pic, 1938^{i c g}
- Lucidota probata E. Olivier, 1909^{i c g}
- Lucidota propinqua E. Olivier, 1909^{i c g}
- Lucidota proscripta E. Olivier, 1906^{i c g}
- Lucidota proxima Gorham, 1880^{i c g}
- Lucidota punctata (LeConte, 1852)^{i c g b}
- Lucidota purulana (Gorham, 1884)^{i c g}
- Lucidota pygidialis E. Olivier, 1886^{i c g}
- Lucidota pygmaea E. Olivier in Wytsman, 1907^{i c g}
- Lucidota quadratifera Lucas, 1859^{i c g}
- Lucidota quadriguttata Gorham, 1880^{i c g}
- Lucidota ramicornis Pic, 1932^{i c g}
- Lucidota reductitincta Pic, 1943^{i c g}
- Lucidota roseimaculata (Blanchard in Brullé, 1846)^{i c g}
- Lucidota rufescens Pic, 1935^{i c g}
- Lucidota ruficollis (Motschulsky, 1854)^{i c g}
- Lucidota rufithorax (E. Olivier, 1911)^{i c g}
- Lucidota saepta E. Olivier, 1908^{i c g}
- Lucidota serricornis E. Olivier, 1909^{i c g}
- Lucidota severa (E. Olivier, 1911)^{i c g}
- Lucidota sexguttata E. Olivier, 1886^{i c g}
- Lucidota signaticollis Pic, 1930^{i c g}
- Lucidota signaticornis E. Olivier in Wytsman, 1907^{i c g}
- Lucidota simoni E. Olivier, 1900^{i c g}
- Lucidota sinuaticollis Gorham, 1884^{i c g}
- Lucidota sparsicolor E. Olivier, 1913^{i c g}
- Lucidota subdubitata Mutchler, 1923^{i c g}
- Lucidota submaculata (Pic, 1940)^{i c g}
- Lucidota subnigra Pic, 1940^{i c g}
- Lucidota supplex E. Olivier, 1909^{i c g}
- Lucidota taciturna E. Olivier, 1906^{i c g}
- Lucidota tardita E. Olivier, 1896^{i c g}
- Lucidota tenuecincta E. Olivier, 1911^{i c g}
- Lucidota tenuis E. Olivier, 1896^{i c g}
- Lucidota testaceipes (Pic, 1927)^{i c g}
- Lucidota tincta Gorham, 1884^{i c g}
- Lucidota tricolor Gorham, 1880^{i c g}
- Lucidota tricostata Pic, 1935^{i c g}
- Lucidota tristicolor E. Olivier, 1909^{i c g}
- Lucidota tristis (Blanchard in Brullé, 1846)^{i c g}
- Lucidota uberadana Pic, 1930^{i c g}
- Lucidota vitricollis Gorham, 1884^{i c g}
- Lucidota wagneri Pic, 1940^{i c g}
- Lucidota xanthocera Lucas, 1859^{i c g}
- Lucidota xanthopleura Gorham, 1884^{i c g}

Data sources: i = ITIS, c = Catalogue of Life, g = GBIF, b = Bugguide.net
