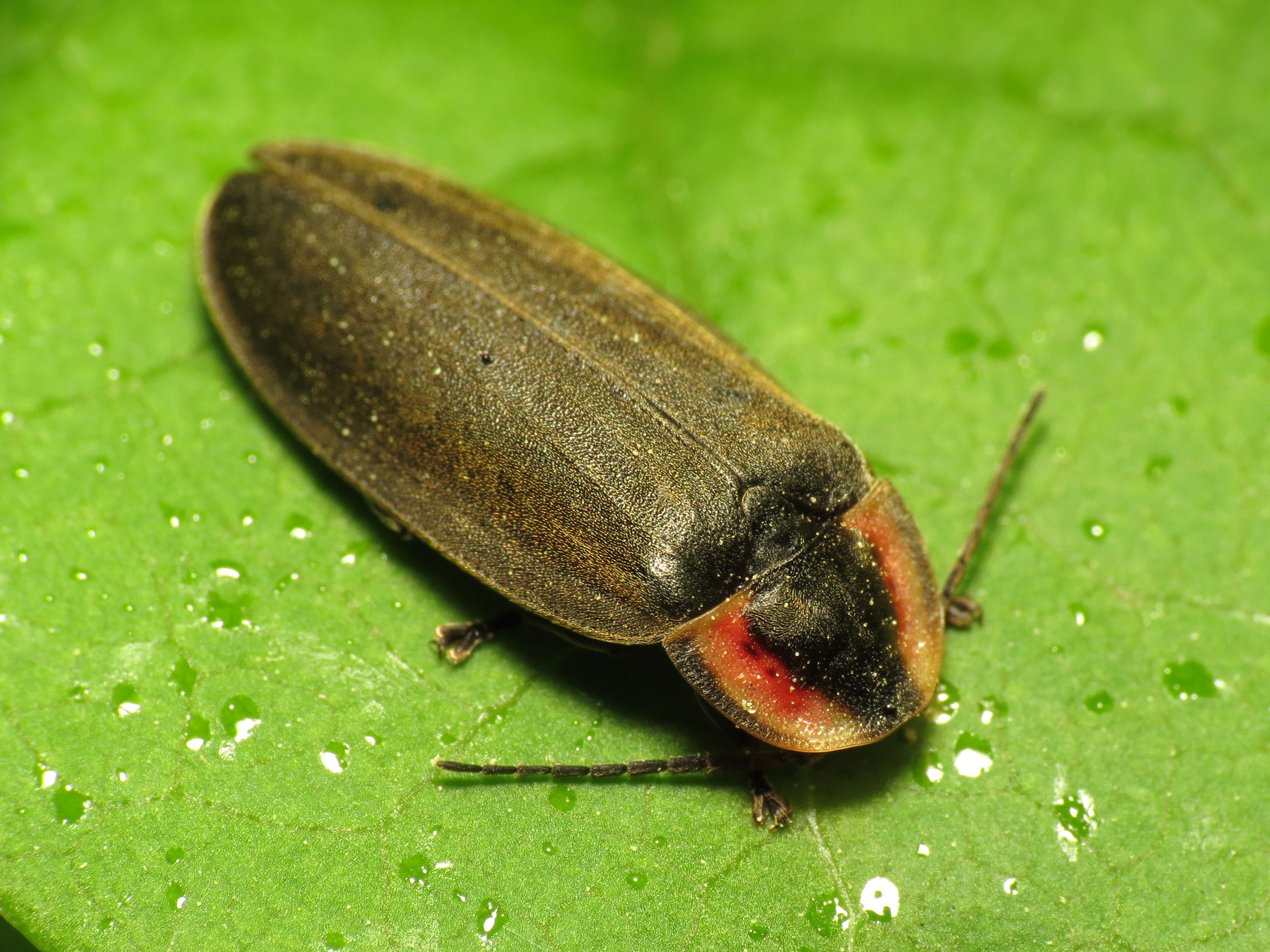

Conservation status
- Least Concern (IUCN 3.1)

- Secure (NatureServe)

Scientific classification
- Kingdom: Animalia
- Phylum: Arthropoda
- Clade: Pancrustacea
- Class: Insecta
- Order: Coleoptera
- Suborder: Polyphaga
- Infraorder: Elateriformia
- Family: Lampyridae
- Genus: Ellychnia
- Species: E. corrusca

Binomial name
- Ellychnia corrusca Linnaeus, 1767

= Ellychnia corrusca =

Species of beetle

Ellychnia corrusca, the winter firefly, is a species of firefly in the genus Ellychnia. It is a lantern-less diurnal beetle common in the United States, Mexico, and Canada. The adults spend winter on a colony tree, favoring Quercus (oak), Carya (hickory), and Liriodendron tulipifera (tulip poplar).

This beetle can be found in a large variety of habitats. In the maple syrup business, these beetles are commonly found in the buckets of sap from tapped trees.

== Description ==
Ellychnia corrusca is a medium to large beetle, with adults that are 9 to 18 mm (0.4 to 0.7 in) long. The head shield, or pronotum, has a black, rounded central mark bordered by yellow and pink on both sides. The pronotum has black edges. The wing covers, or elytra, are dark and have fine hairs that can seem greenish or golden in certain light conditions. Adult E. corrusca do not have lanterns. The last abdominal segment on the underside of the adults differs between males and females. On males, it is small and rounded, and on females it is larger and triangular with a small central notch.

The larvae are dark with pink sides and thick, bristled bodies. They grow up to 17 mm (0.67 in) long. Each larva has two lanterns that glow.

== Range ==
Ellychnia corrusca is common throughout the United States, Mexico, and Canada east of the Rocky Mountains.

== Habitat ==
Ellychnia corrusca can be found in a variety of habitats, most commonly in maturing hardwood forests, yards, and open parks with large trees.

== Life cycle ==
=== Eggs, larvae, and pupae ===
After mating, the females lay their eggs nearby, and they hatch in early summer. In the north, the larvae eat and grow within decaying wood for the next 16 months, pupating in the late summer of their second year. In the south, E. corrusca completes its life cycle in one year, with the larvae pupating after a single summer and fall, becoming adults in late winter.

=== Adults ===
In northern areas (around the 40th parallel north and above), adults emerge in the fall and overwinter on the bark of certain colony trees, becoming active as temperatures warm in early spring. The mating season is approximately six weeks in length, occurring early April through mid-May. In southern areas, adults emerge in late winter, February and March, and begin crawling up tree trunks, mating in early spring.

=== Seasonal effects ===
Ellychnia corrusca displays high levels of overwintering with a low winter mortality rate. Adults overwinter for a single year. In a study done from 1997 to 1999, overwintering adults had monthly survival rates of 88%-99%. Causes of death for overwintering beetles include cold and predation. Some adults were seen on their backs during periods of extreme cold weather, and there were detached wing covers found at the base of overwintering trees. E. corrusca populations remained constant during the winter, but the spring had some population changes. From April through May, the number of adults on trees decreased significantly. From late fall to winter (September 28 - March 7), no adults were observed flying. By March 18, adults could fly back to trees. Adult beetles showed some increased movement on bark during early March. E. corrusca mating pairs began to appear during April–May. Male and female beetles display an increase in reproductive readiness in mid-March, which is indicated by an increase in mature oocytes in females and increase in percentage of females with sperm in the spermatheca.

The mating process consists of the E. corrusca adults crawling around tree trunks looking for mates in the early spring. Males first contact females with their antennae before they mount females dorsally to initiate copulation.

== Mating ==
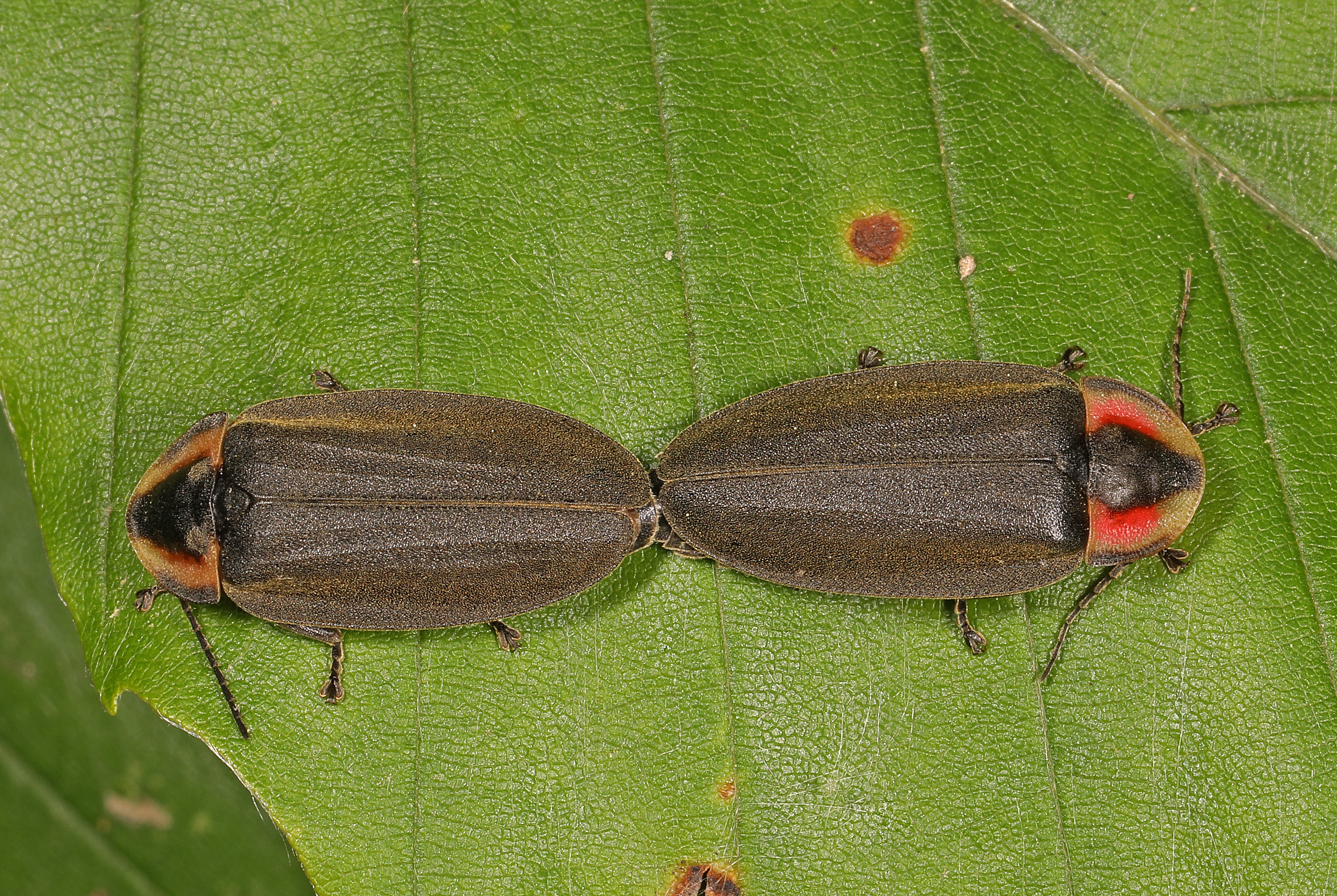
Winter fireflies mating, showcasing male E. corrusca's provision of spermatophores, which provide nutrients for somatic maintenance and reproduction

Males provide nuptial gifts to females during mating. In E. corrusca, this includes spermatophores. Multiple spermatophores resulted in females laying more eggs. E. corrusca females had higher fecundity in 3 matings compared to 1. Females had a 41% increase in triply mated females versus singly mated. E. corrusca has a lifespan of approximately 10 months. This is longer compared to other firefly species where the lifespan is a few weeks. Because of E. corrusca's longer lifespan, they are believed to use male nutrients from spermatophores for somatic maintenance and reproduction; female somatic tissue contains 64% of male-derived protein and 21% in oocytes. Aside from spermatophores, male accessory gland products can act as oviposition stimulants.

Prior to copulation, E. corrusca uses maxillary palps to examine females. E. corrusca are also diurnal fireflies, which rely on pheromonal signals. In a study comparing nocturnal and diurnal fireflies, both diurnal fireflies of interest displayed more diversity of cuticular hydrocarbons (CHCs). Gas chromatography data shows an abundance of CHC peaks in another diurnal firefly called Lucidota atra. In E. corrusca, CHC abundance was lower compared to Lucidota atra, but there were similar CHC peaks. Additionally, E. corrusca is more attracted to and spends more time with extracts from conspecific females compared to heterospecific females. E. corrusca displayed an increase in walking and antennation in the presence of such extracts, which shows how E. corrusca males use contact chemical signals when recognizing species.

The spermatophore is coiled and gelatinous and is transferred to the female within 30 minutes of copulation. Following an hour of copulation, the sperm bundles are released into the female spermatheca and the remaining spermatophore moves to the spermatophore-digesting gland. Spermatophore transfer from males to females resulted in transfer of radiolabel to females, ranging from 53,000 to 827,000 dpm (disintegrations per minute). 3 hours after copulation, 53% of transferred radiolabel was found in the spermatophore-digesting gland (SDG) and 23% in female somatic tissue. The somatic increase is the result of increased counts of female fat body. At 4 days, 64% of radiolabel appeared in somatic tissue and the spermatophore in the SDG disintegrated. Radiolabel in oocytes was at a maximum of 22% six days after mating. In E. corrusca females, a majority of spermatophore-derived protein is used for fat body reserves.

== Predation and parasitism ==
=== Enemies ===
Larvae are preyed on by rodents, birds, and spiders. The specific spider species that prey upon larvae are Phidippus johnsoni and Acanthepeira stellate. These spiders feed on pupae and newly eclosed adults. Porcellio scaber eat the exuvia of pupae.

Parasites of adults include phorids. Antennatus apocephalus are observed to parasitise adults.

Fireflies flicker their lights, which initially attract predators like jumping spiders, but repeated encounters lead spiders to learn that fireflies are unpalatable and prompt them to drop the insects.

=== Protective behavior ===
Ellychnia corrusca possesses lucibufagins (LBGs), which are defense chemicals against predators. However, summer-active fireflies of the Photuris genus hunt prey containing lucibufagins. Scientists propose that in order to defend themselves, E. corrusca alters its reproduction timeline to help it escape Photuris fireflies. E. corrusca overwinters and reproduces in the spring, which therefore reduces its overlap with Photuris that are active during the summer. In an experiment done with E. corrusca and a mealworm beetle control, the Photuris are drawn to the LBGs emitted by E. corrusca. In fact, mealworm beetles that did not have LBGs failed to generate a response from Photuris. When mealworm beetles were treated with LBGs, however, Photuris did consume them. In order to avoid predation, E. corrusca had a phenological shift to winter and spring reproduction and a shift to the daytime.

== Microbiome ==
Holistically, fireflies such as E. corrusca hold low bacterial diversity. Their gut microbiomes are often dominated by a single species. E. corrusca egg and adult microbiomes were unique. One exception included a single egg microbiome that shared a community with adults. This could mean there is a transfer of microbes from mother to offspring. E. corrusca eggs had abundances of Tanticharoenia and Gluconobacter. In a study done in 2016–2017, samples of E. corrusca were collected from forests in Vernon, Bolton, and Andover, CT, USA.E. corrusca adults were organized into community types, which are defined as genera of bacteria with abundances greater than 30% in study samples. There were 7 community types: Mesoplasma, Salmonella, Salmonella & Mesoplasma, Serratia, Rickettsia, Pseudomonas, and Rickettsiella. When compared with other firefly species, such as Photuris, Mesoplasma (amplicon sequence variant) ASVs, Salmonella, Serratia, Rickettsia, and Rickettsiella were more common in E. corrusca. Wolbachia is a bacteria that was low in E. corrusca but had higher levels in the eggs compared to the adults. In adults, there were higher levels of Mesoplasma, Pseudomonas, and Acinetobacter.

Mollicute bacteria were the most common in fireflies which could be a symbiotic relationship. In E. corrusca, there was an abundance of Spiroplasma. This is very similar to the 16s rRNA sequence of S. corruscae, which was isolated from E. corrusca. Mesoplasma in E. corrusca showed similarity to 16s rRNA sequences in M. corruscae and Entomoplasma ellychniae which were also isolated from E. corrusca. By constructing a phylogenetic tree, the mollicute sequences from the same study are closely related to bacteria strains that have been isolated before.

Ellychnia corrusca's lifestyle could be an explanation for its unique microbiome. They are active in the winter and use tree sap as a food source. This food source could be how microbes are acquired. E. corrusca inhabits soil, tree bark, and leaves, which is also where Pseudomonas ASVs were found. Mesoplama found in E. corrusca resembled M. corruscae and Entomoplasma ellychniae, both of which were isolated from E. corrusca. Both isolated strains are related to Mesoplasma, which occurs on plants without causing disease. Mesoplasma could have been acquired by E. corrusca when they feed on sap.

Of note, Sprioplasma corruscae is a bacterium found in the gut of E. corrusca. The genome of the bacterium includes a circular chromosome and a plasmid. Annotations of this gene include 16S-23S-5S rRNA genes, 29 tRNA genes with all 20 amino acids covered, 1,039 protein-coding genes, and a pseudogene.

=== Other specialized bacteria (non-gastrointestinal) ===
Ellychnia corrusca and other firefly beetles are abundant in mollicutes. Mollicutes are a class of symbiont bacteria that live with fireflies. Sprioplasma is believed to be one of the most common bacteria in arthropods. The first named Entomoplasma species (Entomoplasma ellychinae) was discovered in E. corrusca. Origins of these microbes can be explained by the fireflies' luminescence. This is because luminescence is believed to be an energy rich metabolic pathway. Fireflies' luminescence could provide an ample environment for microbes.

Mollicutes could also be present in E. corrusca due to lucibufagins in the hemolymph. Lucibufagins are steroid-related molecules that are synthesized from cholesterol, which could provide nutrients for spiroplasmas and mycoplasmas. In addition to the hemolymph, mollicutes are found in the gut of E. corrusca and other fireflies. These mollicutes could have been transferred to fireflies through shared feeding sites among adults.

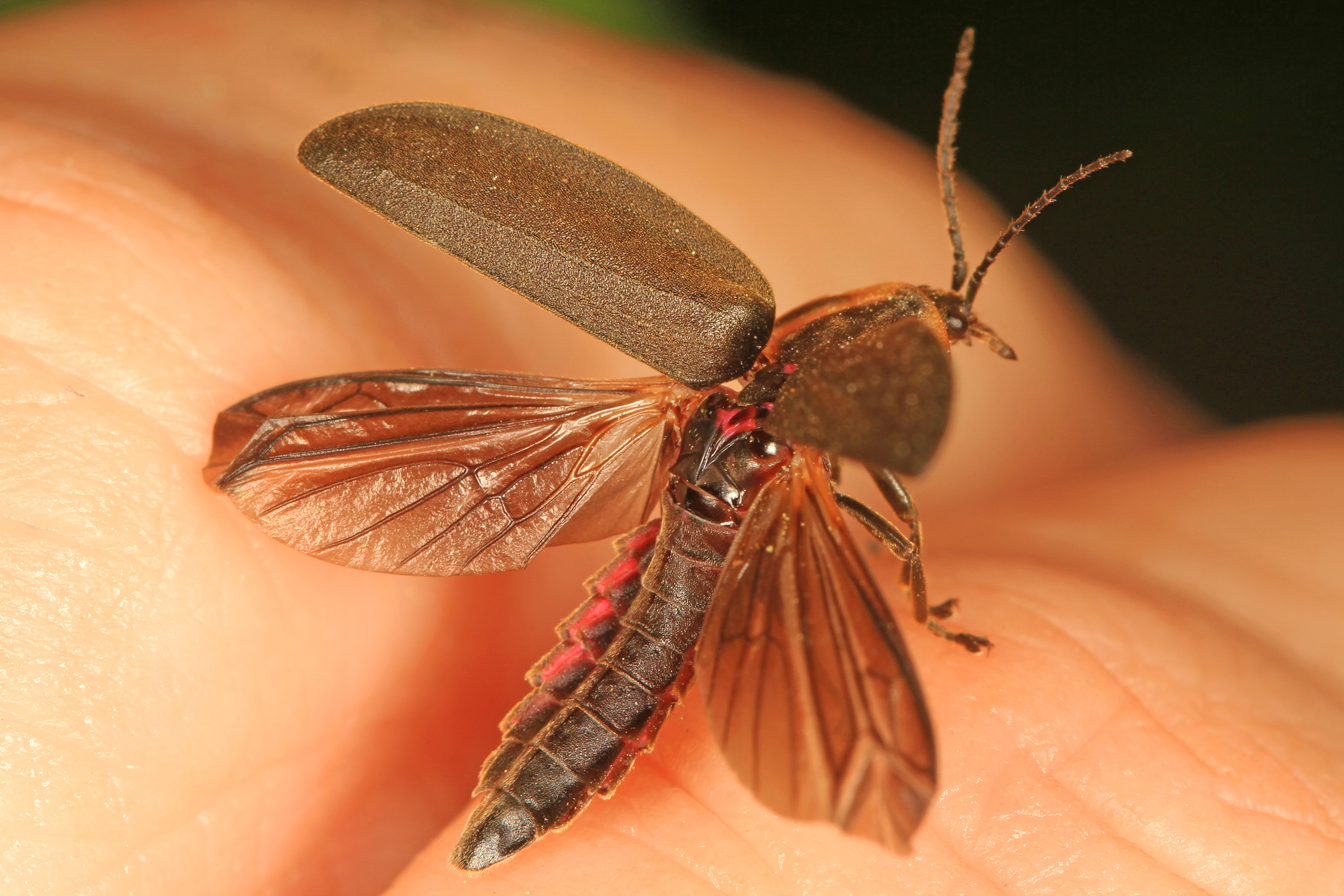
E. corrusca, found abundantly in maple sap collection buckets, poses a significant pest threat to the lucrative maple syrup industry.

== Interaction with humans ==
Ellychnia corrusca and the maple syrup industry are closely related. In Canada, the maple syrup production has a value of over $168 million CAD. Syrup production involves tapping trees, and over 38 million trees are tapped per year. This large scale syrup production attracts insects. Maple sap collection buckets in Prince Edward Island were investigated to see the insects inside of them. E. corrusca was very abundant in the buckets. There were more than 100 individuals in the sap buckets. E. corrusca feed on floral nectarines of the Norway maple. Additionally, they are attracted to natural sap flows in Acer saccharum. Their attraction to the sap has labeled them as a pest. The insects in the sap buckets is a significant amount, which could have considerable ecological and economic effects.
