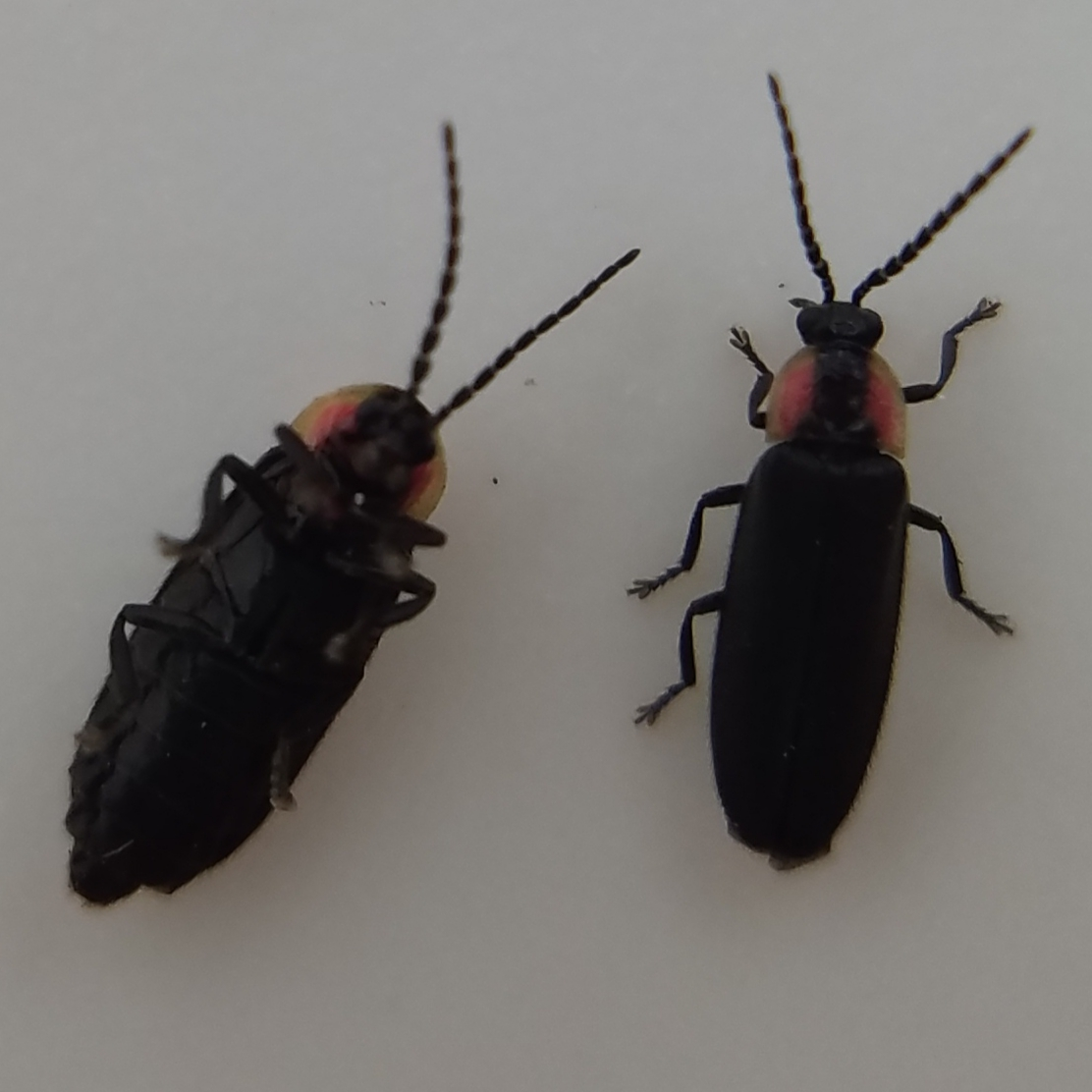

Conservation status
- Least Concern (IUCN 3.1)

Scientific classification
- Kingdom: Animalia
- Phylum: Arthropoda
- Clade: Pancrustacea
- Class: Insecta
- Order: Coleoptera
- Suborder: Polyphaga
- Infraorder: Elateriformia
- Family: Lampyridae
- Genus: Pyropyga
- Species: P. minuta

Binomial name
- Pyropyga minuta (LeConte, 1852)

= Pyropyga minuta =

Species of beetle

Pyropyga minuta, or flower elf, is a species of day-active firefly in the beetle family Lampyridae. It is found in Central America and North America.

== Description ==
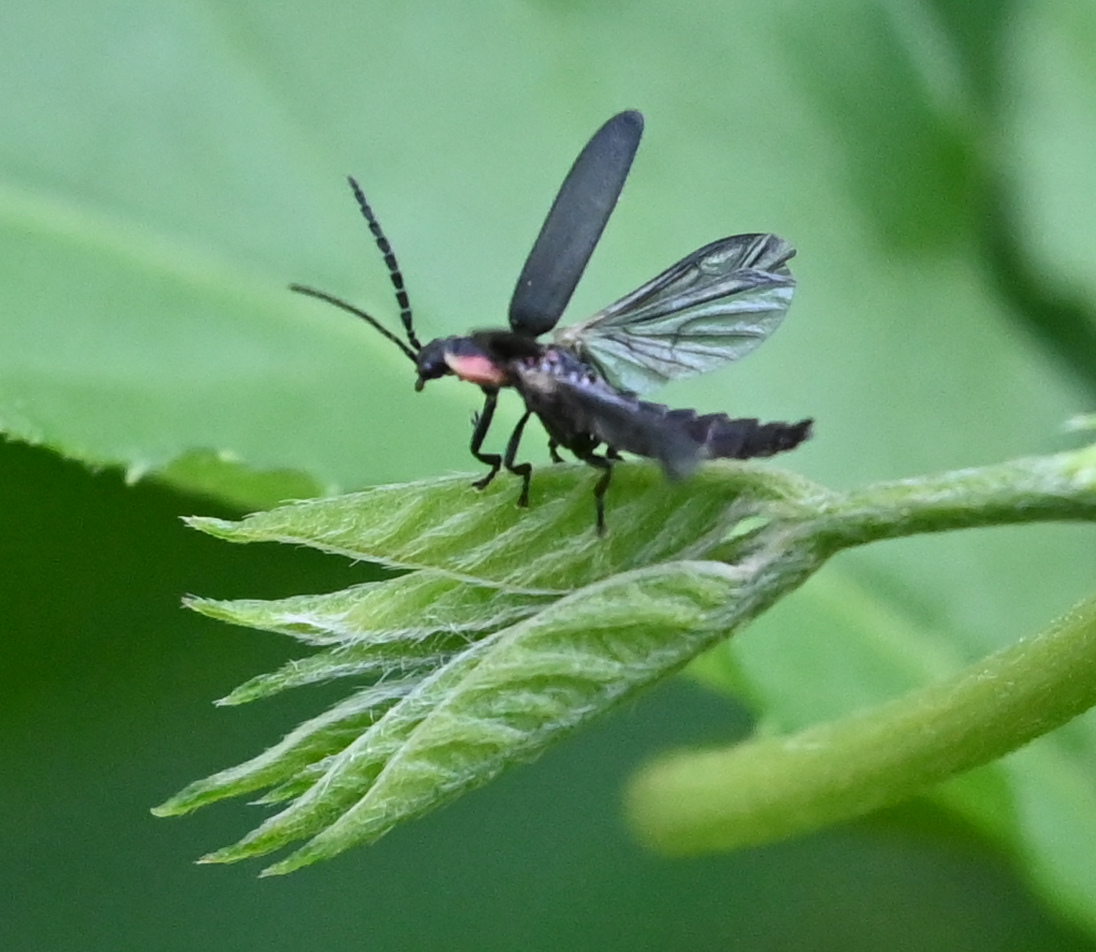
Flower Elf (Pyropyga minuta) on black elderberry leaf, about to fly

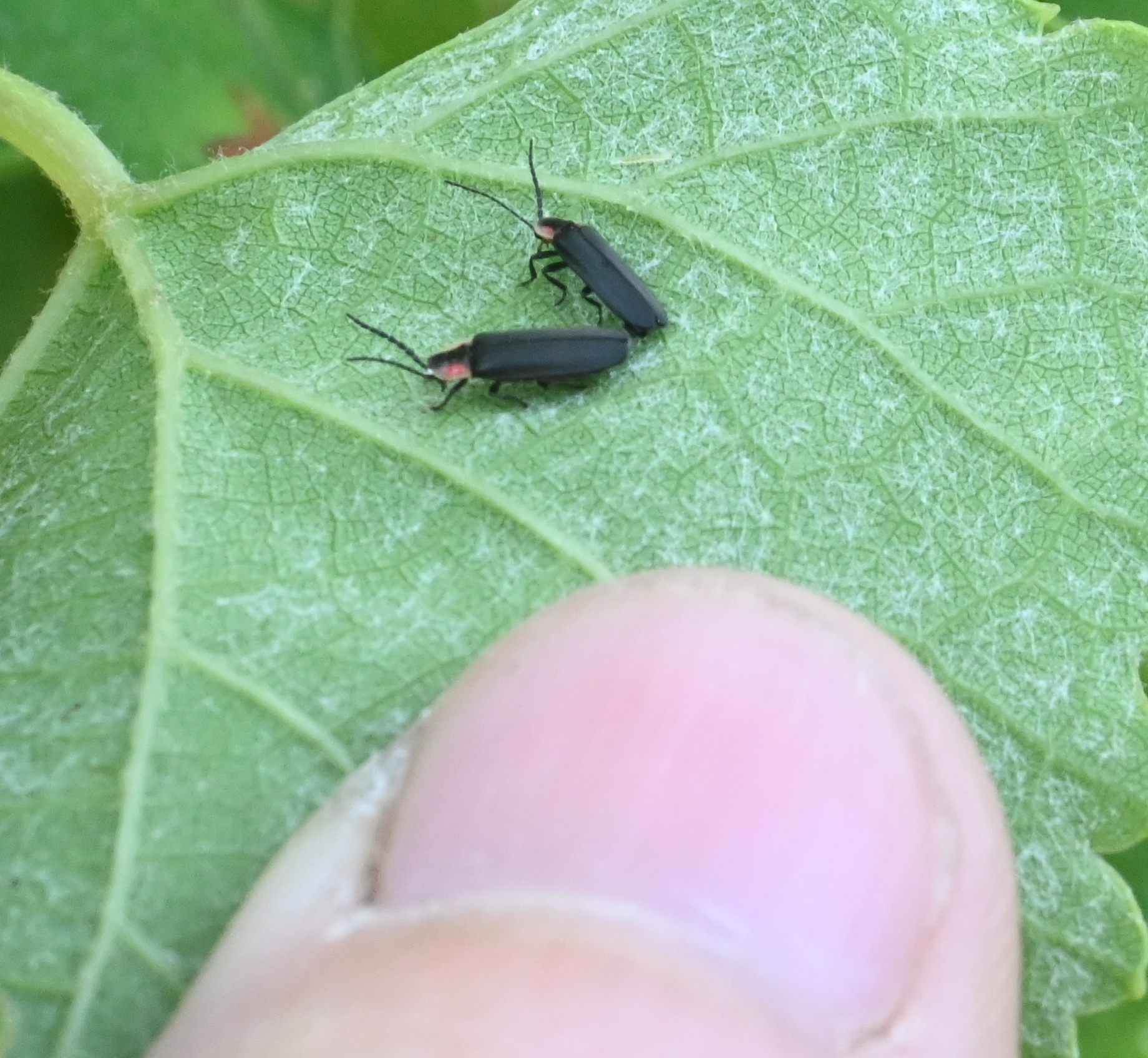
Flower Elf fireflies (Pyropyga minuta) in Bentonville, AR

P. minuta is a tiny beetle, with adults measuring 3–7 mm (0.1–0.3 in) long. Its wing covers, or elytra, and its body are solid black. The head shield, or pronotum, is pale yellow with a narrow, dark rectangular bar in the center, reaching from the top of the pronotum to the base. The bar flares wider towards the bottom and is bounded on the sides by red. Like the other fireflies in the Pyropyga genus, P. minuta does not have working lanterns on its abdomen.

== Etymology ==
The genus name Pyropyga is from Greek, combining "pyro", meaning "fire", and "pyga", meaning "rump" or "tail". The specific epithet, minuta, refers to the firefly's very small size.

== Life Cycle ==
Beetles such as P. minuta go through four life stages: egg, larva, pupa, and adult. Although the adults don't have lanterns and therefore do not flash, the larvae of P. minuta are bioluminescent, like all fireflies. Larvae are believed to be subterranean, living under the soil.

== Behavior ==
P. minuta is a non-flashing firefly, active during the day rather than at night, and they are seen most often in June and July, although they have been found as early as April and as late as September. It is thought that these fireflies locate a mate using pheromones, unlike flashing fireflies, which locate a mate through flash signals at night.

== Habitat ==
Adults are seen during the day in gardens, yards, open woodlands, fencerows, and open areas, often on leaves or on flowers.

== Range ==
P. minuta lives in the southern United States, as far west as New Mexico and as far north as Kansas and North Carolina. They are also found in Mexico and as far south as Guatemala and Honduras. It is often confused in the northern and western parts of its range with other similar Pyropyga species, namely P. decipiens and P. nigricans respectively, though it is more common in the south than either.
