= Paraphotinus =

Scientific classification
- Domain: Eukaryota
- Kingdom: Animalia
- Phylum: Arthropoda
- Class: Insecta
- Order: Coleoptera
- Suborder: Polyphaga
- Infraorder: Elateriformia
- Family: Lampyridae
- Tribe: Photinini
- Genus: Paraphotinus; Zaragoza-Caballero, 1995

Genus of beetles

Paraphotinus is a genus of Central American fireflies (first described as a subgenus), distinguished from the closely related Photinus by the presence of ventral branches in their aedeagal parameres. It was recently elevated to genus level.

== Species list ==
- Paraphotinus aulophallus Zaragoza-Caballero y Gutiérrez-Carranza, 2018
- Paraphotinus furcatus Zaragoza-Caballero, 2000
- Paraphotinus tlapacoyaensis Zaragoza-Caballero, 1996
- Paraphotinus tuxtlaensis Zaragoza-Caballero, 1995
- Paraphotinus victori Zaragoza-Caballero, 2020
