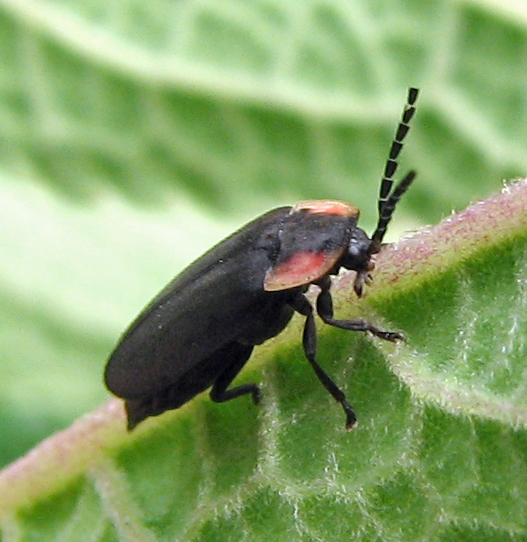

Scientific classification
- Kingdom: Animalia
- Phylum: Arthropoda
- Clade: Pancrustacea
- Class: Insecta
- Order: Coleoptera
- Suborder: Polyphaga
- Infraorder: Elateriformia
- Family: Lampyridae
- Genus: Pyropyga
- Species: P. decipiens

Binomial name
- Pyropyga decipiens (Harris, 1836)

= Pyropyga decipiens =

Species of beetle

Pyropyga decipiens, also known by the common name sneaky elf firefly, is a species of diurnal firefly in the beetle family Lampyridae. It is found in eastern North America.

== Description ==
P. decipiens is a small, flattened beetle with a mostly black striped pronotum and solid black elytra. Unlike most Lampyridae species, P. decipiens lacks a bioluminescent lantern. Adult size ranges from 5 millimeters to 8 millimeters in length.

== Geographic range ==
The sneaky elf firefly ranges from Tennessee north to Eastern Canada. It is often confused in the southern and western parts of its range with other similar Pyropyga species, namely P. minuta and P. nigricans respectively, though it is more common in the north than either.
