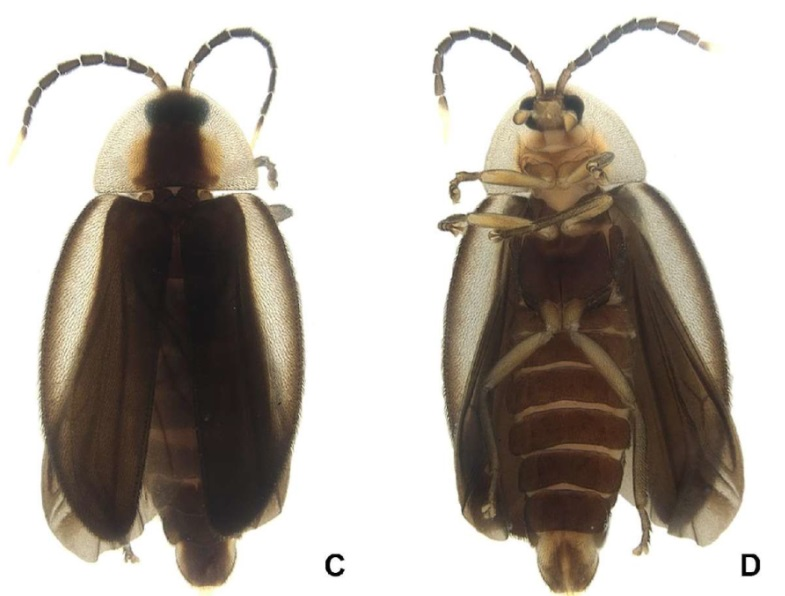

Scientific classification
- Kingdom: Animalia
- Phylum: Arthropoda
- Class: Insecta
- Order: Coleoptera
- Suborder: Polyphaga
- Infraorder: Elateriformia
- Family: Lampyridae
- Genus: Haplocauda
- Species: H. amazonensis

Binomial name
- Haplocauda amazonensis Zeballos and Silveira, 2025

= Haplocauda amazonensis =

Species of beetle

Haplocauda amazonensis is a species of beetle of the family Lampyridae. It is found in Brazil (Amazonas).

== Etymology ==
Amazonensis is a Portuguese gentilic meaning born in Amazonas and refers to the species' origin in the Brazilian state of Amazonas, where Portuguese is the official language.
