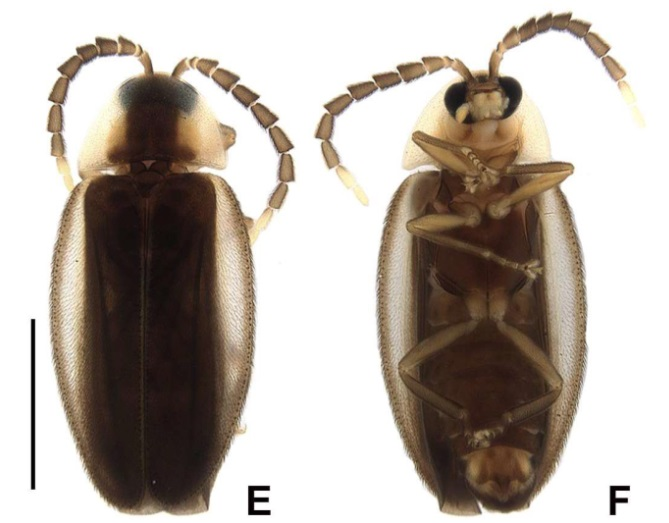

Scientific classification
- Kingdom: Animalia
- Phylum: Arthropoda
- Clade: Pancrustacea
- Class: Insecta
- Order: Coleoptera
- Suborder: Polyphaga
- Infraorder: Elateriformia
- Family: Lampyridae
- Genus: Haplocauda
- Species: H. antimary

Binomial name
- Haplocauda antimary Zeballos and Silveira, 2025

= Haplocauda antimary =

Species of beetle

Haplocauda antimary is a species of beetle of the family Lampyridae. It is found in Acre, a state of Brazil.

== Etymology ==
The species name refers to the Antimary State Forest, located in the State of Acre, where the type specimens were collected.
