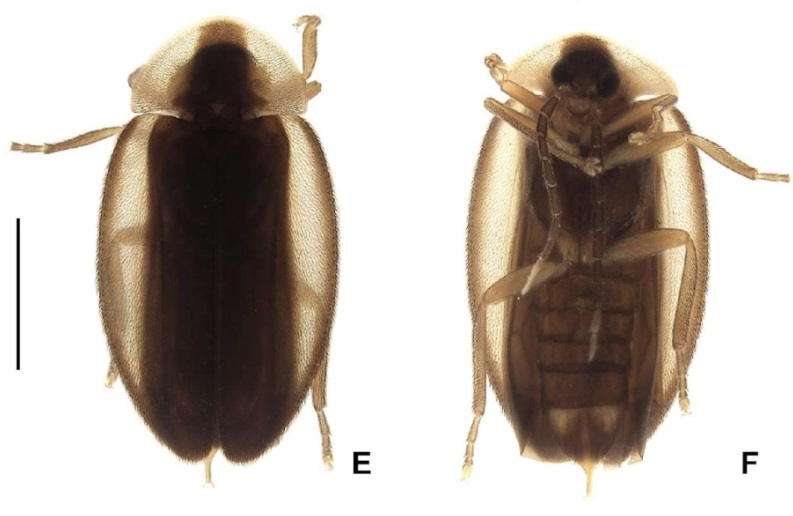

Scientific classification
- Kingdom: Animalia
- Phylum: Arthropoda
- Class: Insecta
- Order: Coleoptera
- Suborder: Polyphaga
- Infraorder: Elateriformia
- Family: Lampyridae
- Genus: Haplocauda
- Species: H. aculeata

Binomial name
- Haplocauda aculeata Zeballos and Silveira, 2025

= Haplocauda aculeata =

Species of beetle

Haplocauda aculeata is a species of beetle of the family Lampyridae. It is found in Brazil (Amazonas).

== Etymology ==
Aculeata is a Latin adjective meaning sting-bearing and refers to the prominent median projection of sternum VIII on the male abdomen.
