= Pyropyga modesta =

Scientific classification
- Domain: Eukaryota
- Kingdom: Animalia
- Phylum: Arthropoda
- Class: Insecta
- Order: Coleoptera
- Suborder: Polyphaga
- Infraorder: Elateriformia
- Family: Lampyridae
- Genus: Pyropyga
- Species: P. modesta

Binomial name
- Pyropyga modesta Green, 1961

Species of beetle

Pyropyga modesta is a species of firefly in the beetle family Lampyridae. It is found in Central America and North America.
