= Ellychnia greeni =

Conservation status
- Least Concern (IUCN 3.1)

Scientific classification
- Kingdom: Animalia
- Phylum: Arthropoda
- Class: Insecta
- Order: Coleoptera
- Suborder: Polyphaga
- Infraorder: Elateriformia
- Family: Lampyridae
- Genus: Ellychnia
- Species: E. greeni

Binomial name
- Ellychnia greeni Fender in Hatch, 1962
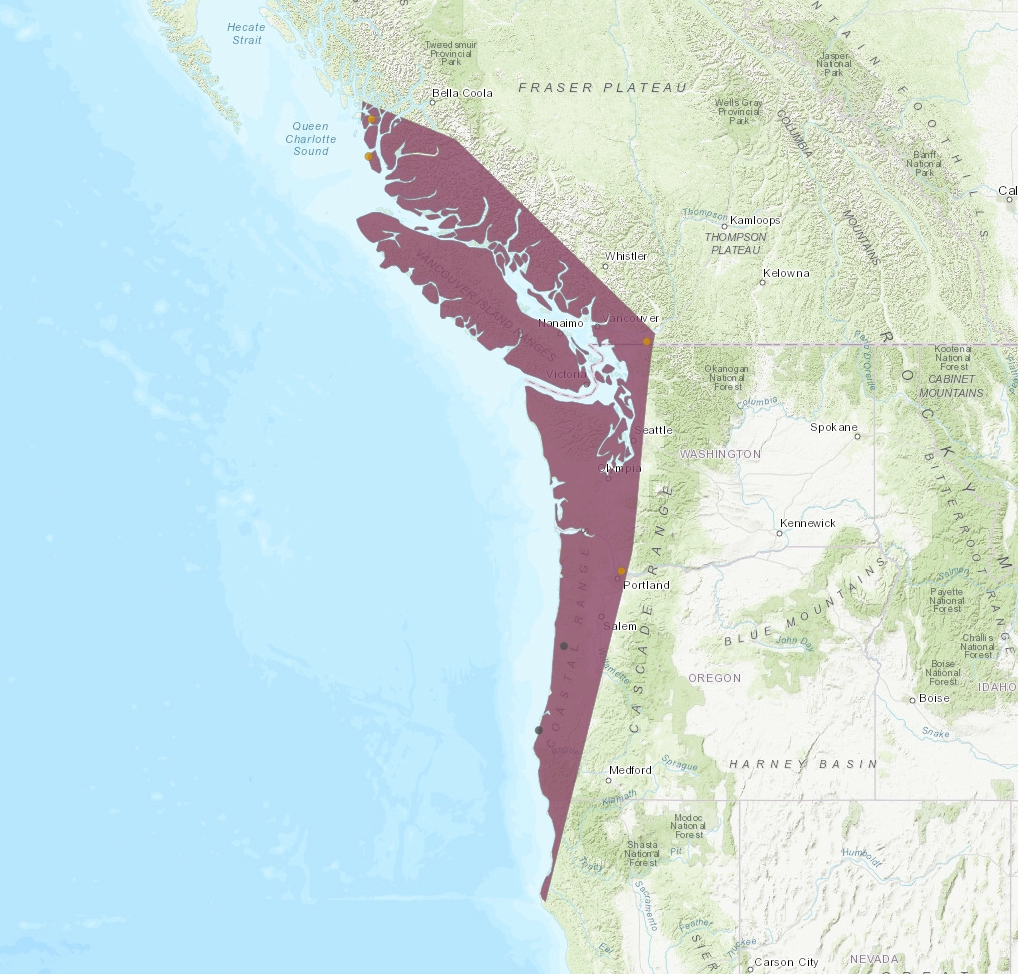

Species of beetle

Ellychnia greeni is a species of firefly in the genus Ellychnia.
