= Pyropyga alticola =

Scientific classification
- Domain: Eukaryota
- Kingdom: Animalia
- Phylum: Arthropoda
- Class: Insecta
- Order: Coleoptera
- Suborder: Polyphaga
- Infraorder: Elateriformia
- Family: Lampyridae
- Genus: Pyropyga
- Species: P. alticola

Binomial name
- Pyropyga alticola Green, 1961

Species of beetle

Pyropyga alticola is a species of firefly in the beetle family Lampyridae. It is found natively in Central America.

Notably, it or a close relative is believed to be the Pyropyga species which was accidentally introduced and became established as an invasive species in the Kantō Plain of Japan.
