= Ellychnia hatchi =

Scientific classification
- Kingdom: Animalia
- Phylum: Arthropoda
- Class: Insecta
- Order: Coleoptera
- Suborder: Polyphaga
- Infraorder: Elateriformia
- Family: Lampyridae
- Genus: Ellychnia
- Species: E. hatchi

Binomial name
- Ellychnia hatchi Fender in Hatch, 1962

Species of beetle

Ellychnia hatchi is a species of firefly in the genus Ellychnia.
