= Lucidota luteicollis =

Scientific classification
- Kingdom: Animalia
- Phylum: Arthropoda
- Class: Insecta
- Order: Coleoptera
- Suborder: Polyphaga
- Infraorder: Elateriformia
- Family: Lampyridae
- Genus: Lucidota
- Species: L. luteicollis

Binomial name
- Lucidota luteicollis (LeConte, 1878)

Species of beetle

Lucidota luteicollis is a species of firefly in the beetle family Lampyridae. It is endemic to Florida scrubs in Florida.
