= Ellychnia simplex =

Conservation status
- Data Deficient (IUCN 3.1)

Scientific classification
- Kingdom: Animalia
- Phylum: Arthropoda
- Class: Insecta
- Order: Coleoptera
- Suborder: Polyphaga
- Infraorder: Elateriformia
- Family: Lampyridae
- Genus: Ellychnia
- Species: E. simplex

Binomial name
- Ellychnia simplex (LeConte, 1885)

Species of beetle

Ellychnia simplex is a species of firefly in the genus Ellychnia.
