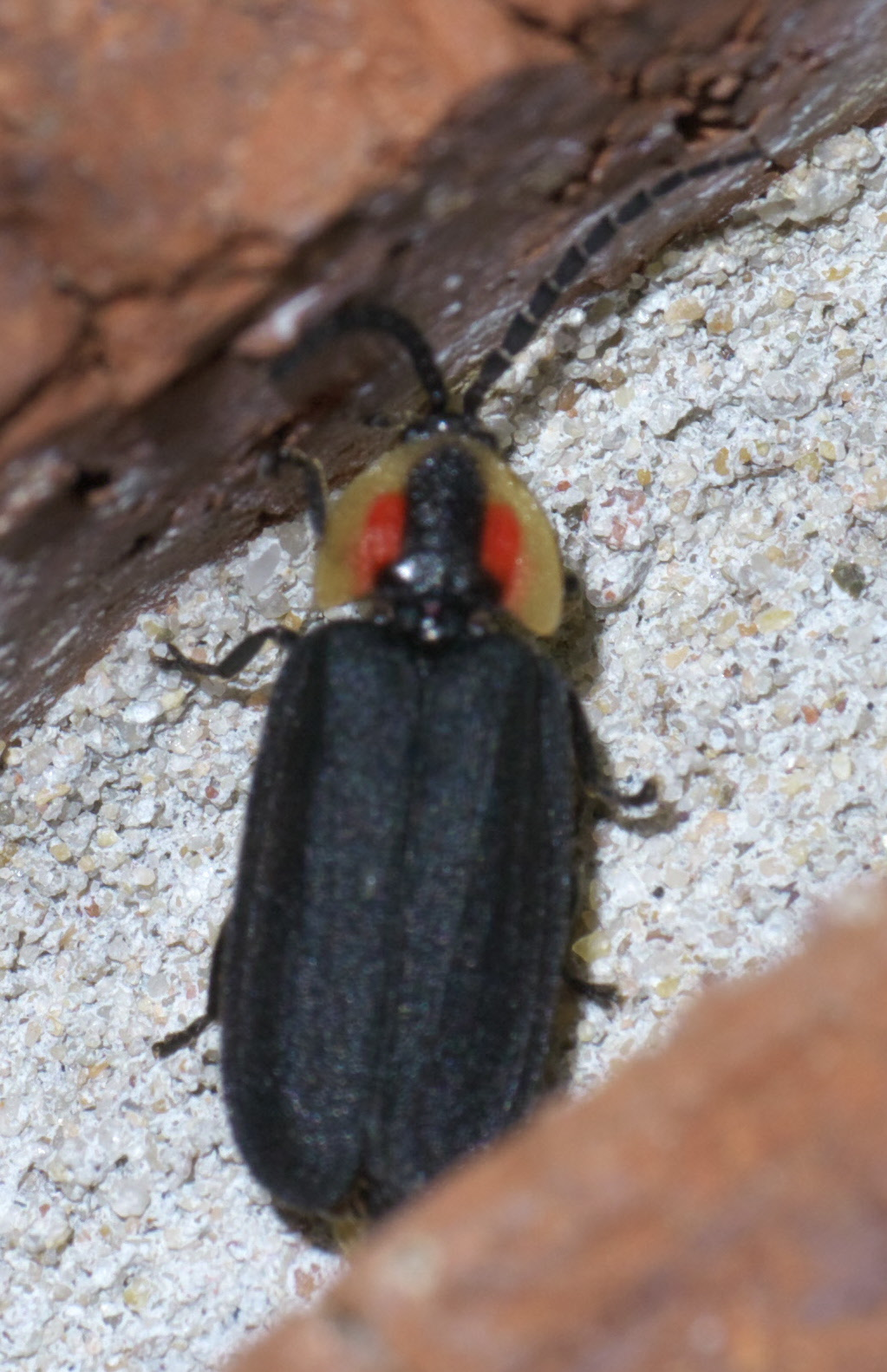

Conservation status
- Least Concern (IUCN 3.1)

Scientific classification
- Kingdom: Animalia
- Phylum: Arthropoda
- Clade: Pancrustacea
- Class: Insecta
- Order: Coleoptera
- Suborder: Polyphaga
- Infraorder: Elateriformia
- Family: Lampyridae
- Genus: Lucidota
- Species: L. atra

Binomial name
- Lucidota atra (G. Olivier, 1790)

Synonyms
- Lampyris atra G. Olivier, 1790

= Lucidota atra =

Species of beetle

Lucidota atra, the woodland lucy or black firefly, is a diurnal species of firefly — a member of the Lampyridae family of beetles (order Coleoptera).

== Range ==
Lucidota atra are found in eastern North America. Their range extends west to Kansas, Nebraska, Oklahoma and Texas and south to Mexico.

== Description ==
Adult body length is 9 to 12 mm (0.35 to 0.47 in). This firefly has segmented, conspicuous, black antennae that are serrate, with males having larger antennae. The pronotum extends over the head and is usually red and yellow with a medial black stripe or patch, but may be dark overall in some individuals. The compound eyes are smaller than those of nocturnal species like Photinus pyralis. The elytra are black or brown-black and have granulated texture. The light organ is greatly reduced and difficult to discern in the adult.

== Behavior ==
This is a firefly that flies actively in daylight. Males fly low, about one to six feet (0.30 to 1.83 m) from the ground, through forests in midday, seeking females, which are often perched on low vegetation. Most are seen in the late morning to early afternoon. Male Lucidota atra can identify female mating partners by sensing the female's pheromones with their antennae. Lucidota atra express a characteristic set of odorant receptor genes in their antennae. Both males and females are able to fly.

== Life cycle ==
=== Adults ===
Adults emerge in early to midsummer. In eastern Canada, larvae eclose beginning in late May, and adult numbers peak in late June to mid-July. In the southern Appalachians, numbers peak in mid- to late June.

=== Eggs, larvae, and pupae ===
Once the adults mate, the female lays eggs that hatch in about two to three weeks. The flightless larvae live in moist environments, especially decaying wood, and prey on invertebrates with soft bodies, such as snails and slugs. The advanced larvae or pupae overwinter, becoming adults in early to midsummer.

== Habitat ==
L. atra are found primarily in open forest or shady open areas.

== Light production ==
Adults have no working lanterns, although they often have pale terminal abdominal segments. Larvae are bioluminescent.
