= Lucidota discolor =

Scientific classification
- Kingdom: Animalia
- Phylum: Arthropoda
- Clade: Pancrustacea
- Class: Insecta
- Order: Coleoptera
- Suborder: Polyphaga
- Infraorder: Elateriformia
- Family: Lampyridae
- Genus: Lucidota
- Species: L. discolor

Binomial name
- Lucidota discolor Gorham, 1881

Species of beetle

Lucidota discolor is a species of firefly in the beetle family Lampyridae. It is primarily documented in Central America. It was described by Henry Stephen Gorham in 1881.
