= Heterophotinus =

Scientific classification
- Kingdom: Animalia
- Phylum: Arthropoda
- Clade: Pancrustacea
- Class: Insecta
- Order: Coleoptera
- Suborder: Polyphaga
- Infraorder: Elateriformia
- Family: Lampyridae
- Tribe: Photinini
- Genus: Heterophotinus; E. Olivier, 1894,

Genus of beetles

Heterophotinus is a genus of fireflies from the Caribbean & South America. They were previously known under a variety of genera, including Photinus.

== Species list ==
- Heterophotinus alius Kazantsev, 2006
- Heterophotinus constanzae Kazantsev, 2006
- Heterophotinus dubiosus (Leng et Mutchler, 1922)
- Heterophotinus glaucus (Olivier, 1790)
- Heterophotinus lengi (Mutchler, 1923)
- Heterophotinus limpioensis Kazantsev, 2006
- Heterophotinus merielae Kazantsev, 2006
- Heterophotinus nigricollis Kazantsev, 2006
- Heterophotinus quadrimaculatus (Laporte, 1840)
- Heterophotinus quadrinotatus (Motschulsky, 1854)
- Heterophotinus triangularis (E.Olivier, 1912)
- Heterophotinus viridicolor Kazantsev, 2006
- Heterophotinus vittatus (Olivier, 1790)
