= Ellychnia flavicollis =

Scientific classification
- Domain: Eukaryota
- Kingdom: Animalia
- Phylum: Arthropoda
- Class: Insecta
- Order: Coleoptera
- Suborder: Polyphaga
- Infraorder: Elateriformia
- Family: Lampyridae
- Genus: Ellychnia
- Species: E. flavicollis

Binomial name
- Ellychnia flavicollis (LeConte, 1868)

Species of beetle

Ellychnia flavicollis is a species of firefly in the beetle family Lampyridae. It is found in North America.
