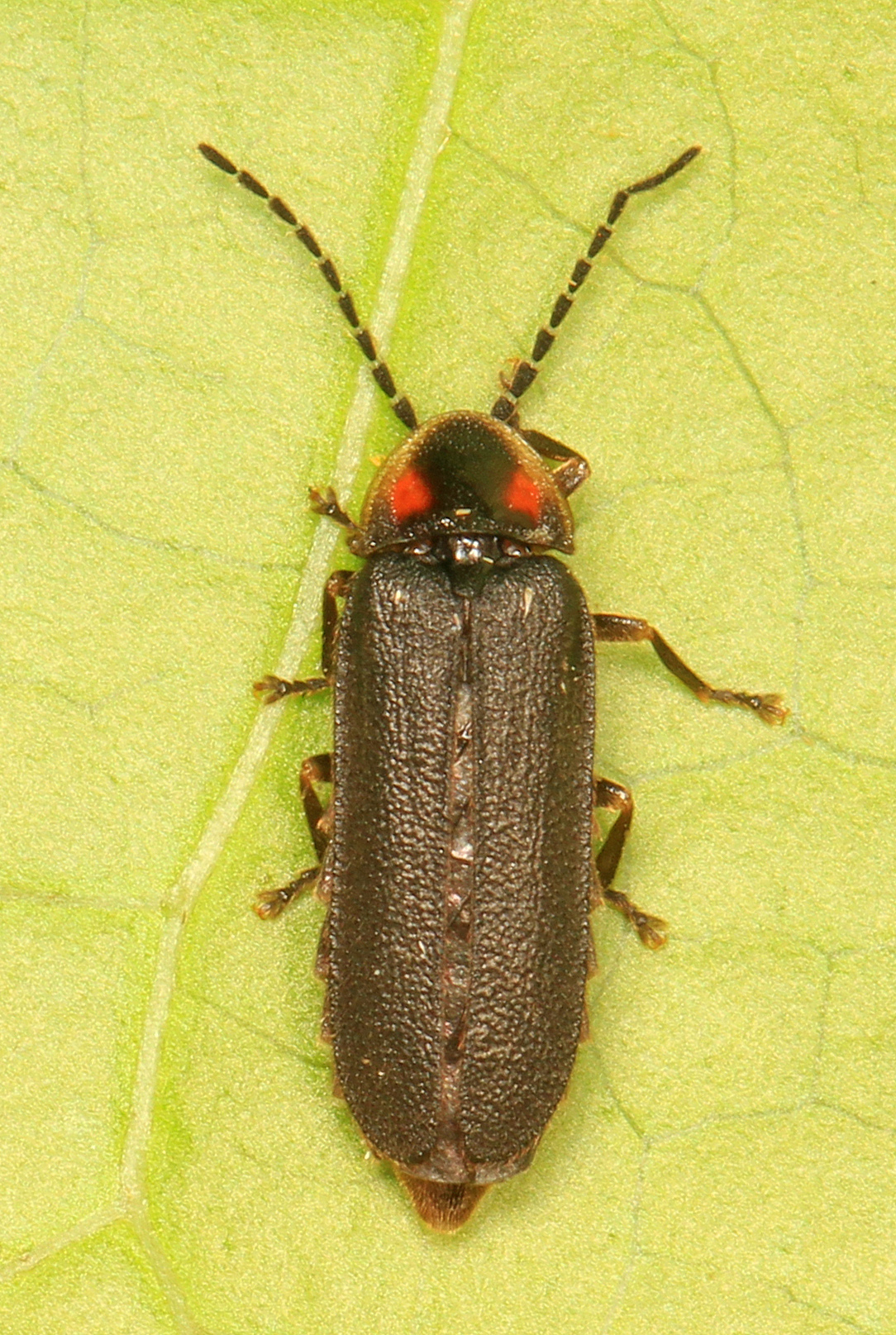

Scientific classification
- Domain: Eukaryota
- Kingdom: Animalia
- Phylum: Arthropoda
- Class: Insecta
- Order: Coleoptera
- Suborder: Polyphaga
- Infraorder: Elateriformia
- Family: Lampyridae
- Genus: Lucidota
- Species: L. punctata

Binomial name
- Lucidota punctata (LeConte, 1852)

= Lucidota punctata =

Species of beetle

Lucidota punctata is a species of firefly in the beetle family Lampyridae. It is found in North America.
