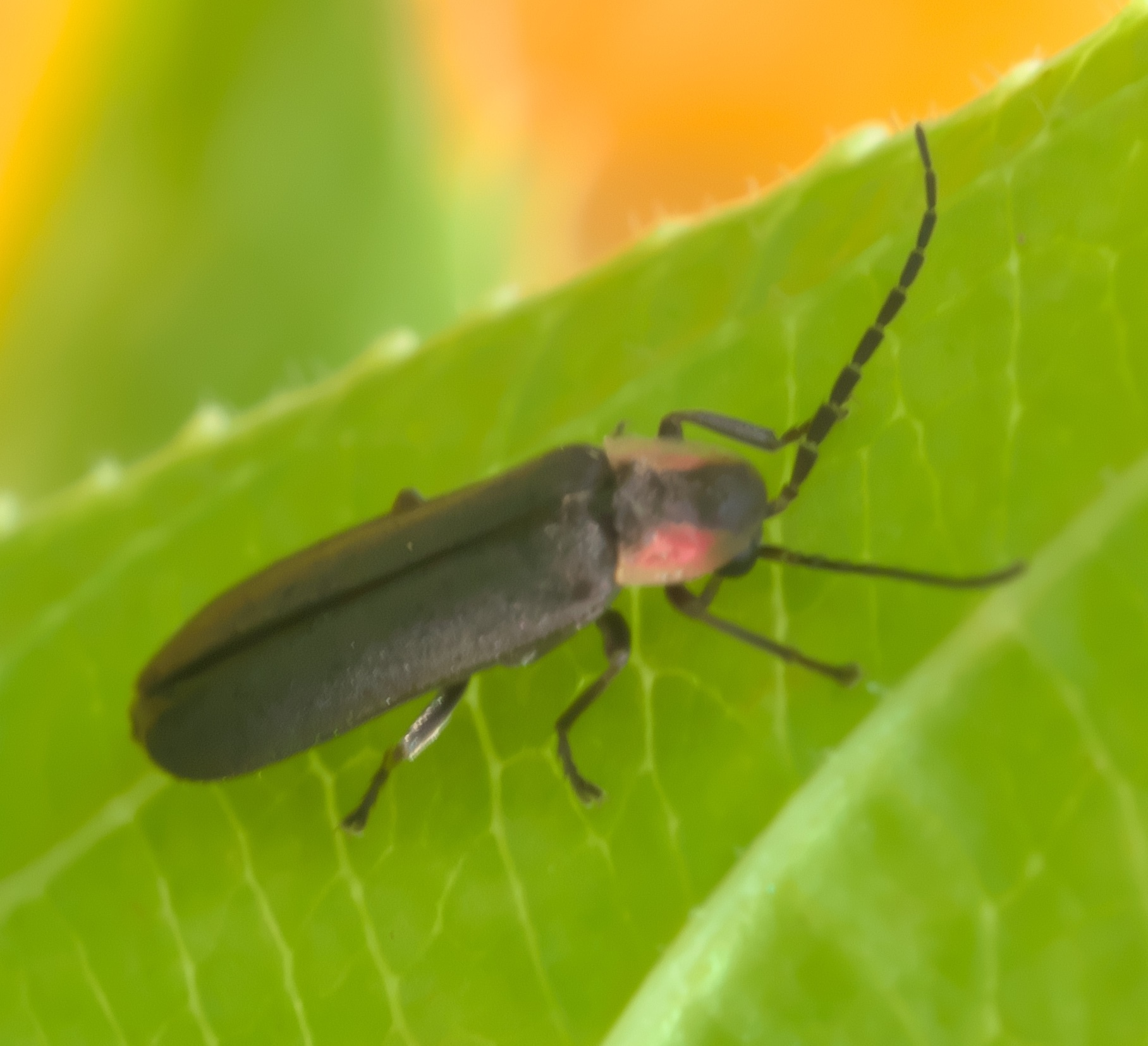
- Pyropyga minuta

Scientific classification
- Kingdom: Animalia
- Phylum: Arthropoda
- Clade: Pancrustacea
- Class: Insecta
- Order: Coleoptera
- Suborder: Polyphaga
- Infraorder: Elateriformia
- Family: Lampyridae
- Tribe: Photinini
- Genus: Pyropyga; Motschulsky, 1852

= Pyropyga =

Genus of beetles

Pyropyga is a genus of primarily North American fireflies in the beetle family Lampyridae. There are about 13 described species in Pyropyga. It is among the genera of Lampyridae where both sexes of adults have no bioluminescent organs. Because of this, they are also colloquially known as dark fireflies.

== Species ==
- Pyropyga alticola Green, 1961
- Pyropyga australis Green, 1961
- Pyropyga chemsaki Zaragoza-Caballero, 1993
- Pyropyga cordobana Green, 1961
- Pyropyga decipiens (Harris, 1836)
- Pyropyga extensa Green, 1961
- Pyropyga incognita E. Olivier, 1912
- Pyropyga minuta (LeConte, 1852)
- Pyropyga modesta Green, 1961
- Pyropyga nigricans (Say, 1823)
- Pyropyga saltensis Green, 1961

=== Nomina dubia ===
- Pyropyga exstincta (Gorham, 1880)
- Pyropyga tarda Motschulsky, 1854
