= Ellychnia lacustris =

Scientific classification
- Domain: Eukaryota
- Kingdom: Animalia
- Phylum: Arthropoda
- Class: Insecta
- Order: Coleoptera
- Suborder: Polyphaga
- Infraorder: Elateriformia
- Family: Lampyridae
- Genus: Ellychnia
- Species: E. lacustris

Binomial name
- Ellychnia lacustris LeConte, 1852

Species of beetle

Ellychnia lacustris is a species of firefly in the genus Ellychnia.
