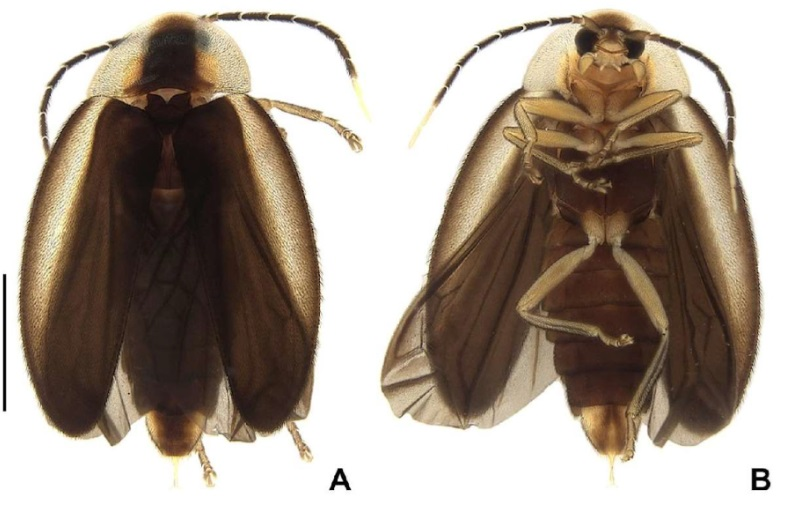

Scientific classification
- Kingdom: Animalia
- Phylum: Arthropoda
- Class: Insecta
- Order: Coleoptera
- Suborder: Polyphaga
- Infraorder: Elateriformia
- Family: Lampyridae
- Genus: Haplocauda
- Species: H. lata

Binomial name
- Haplocauda lata Zeballos and Silveira, 2025

= Haplocauda lata =

Species of beetle

Haplocauda lata is a species of beetle of the family Lampyridae. It is found in Brazil (Amazonas, Pará, Rondonia).

== Etymology ==
The species epithet lata is a Latin adjective meaning wide or broad and refers to the total width of the elytra, which is noticeably greater in this species compared to its congeners.
