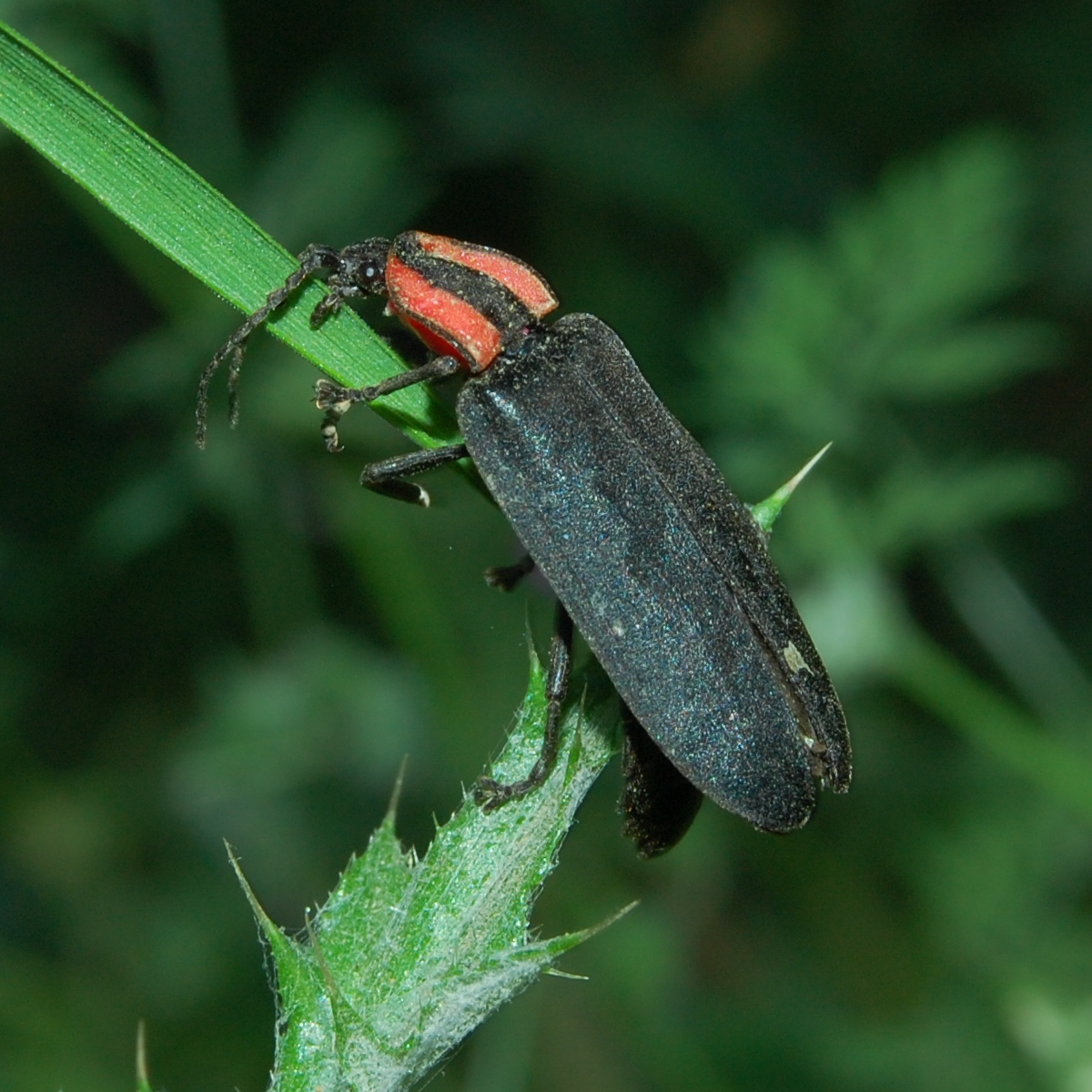

Conservation status
- Data Deficient (IUCN 3.1)

Scientific classification
- Kingdom: Animalia
- Phylum: Arthropoda
- Class: Insecta
- Order: Coleoptera
- Suborder: Polyphaga
- Infraorder: Elateriformia
- Family: Lampyridae
- Genus: Ellychnia
- Species: E. californica

Binomial name
- Ellychnia californica Motschulsky, 1854

= Ellychnia californica =

Species of beetle

Ellychnia californica, known generally as the California glowworm or western firefly, is a species of firefly in the beetle family Lampyridae. It is found in North America.
