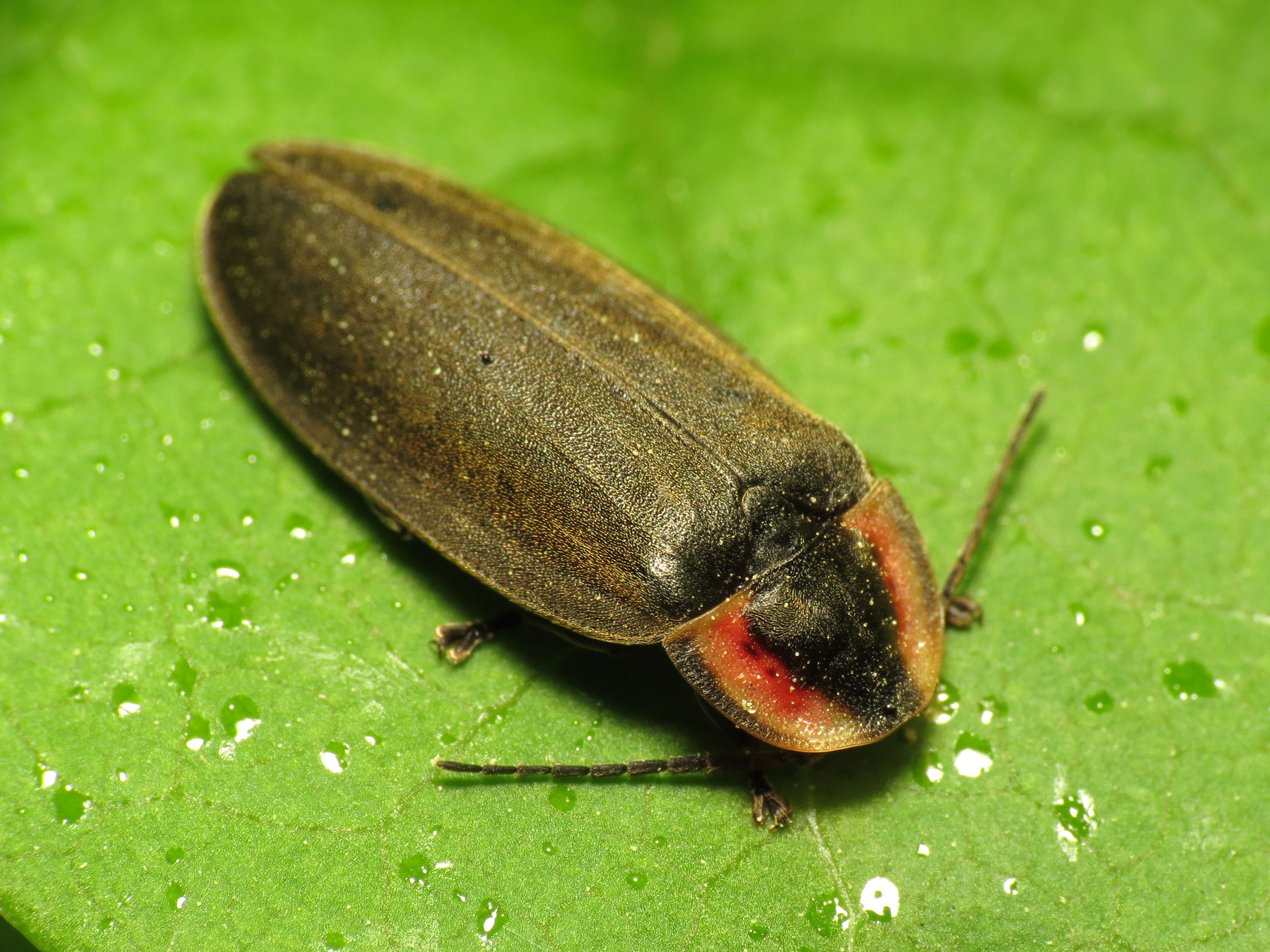
- Ellychnia corrusca

Scientific classification
- Domain: Eukaryota
- Kingdom: Animalia
- Phylum: Arthropoda
- Class: Insecta
- Order: Coleoptera
- Suborder: Polyphaga
- Infraorder: Elateriformia
- Family: Lampyridae
- Subfamily: Lampyrinae
- Tribe: Photinini
- Genus: Ellychnia; Blanchard, 1845

Species
- Ellychnia affinis; Ellychnia albilatera; Ellychnia atra; Ellychnia aurora; Ellychnia autumnalis; Ellychnia bivulneris; Ellychnia californica; Ellychnia cordovae; Ellychnia corrusca; Ellychnia facula; Ellychnia flavicollis; Ellychnia fumigata; Ellychnia granulicollis; Ellychnia greeni; Ellychnia hatchi; Ellychnia lacustris; Ellychnia lunicollis; Ellychnia mexicana; Ellychnia moesta; Ellychnia obscurevittata; Ellychnia salvini; Ellychnia sanguinicollis; Ellychnia simplex; Ellychnia variegata

= Ellychnia =

Genus of beetles

Ellychnia is a genus of fireflies. First defined by Émile Blanchard in 1845, the genus contains 24 species, which are widespread in the United States. Adults are black, with rose-colored marks on the pronotum; sexual dimorphism is unknown. These beetles are active during the day, and have no light-producing organs as adults; instead, they attract mates using chemical signals. The larvae of Ellychnia fireflies live in rotting logs.

== Species list ==
- Ellychnia affinis
- Ellychnia albilatera
- Ellychnia atra
- Ellychnia aurora
- Ellychnia autumnalis
- Ellychnia bivulneris
- Ellychnia californica
- Ellychnia cordovae
- Ellychnia corrusca
- Ellychnia facula
- Ellychnia flavicollis
- Ellychnia fumigata
- Ellychnia granulicollis
- Ellychnia greeni
- Ellychnia hatchi
- Ellychnia lacustris
- Ellychnia lunicollis
- Ellychnia mexicana
- Ellychnia moesta
- Ellychnia obscurevittata
- Ellychnia salvini
- Ellychnia sanguinicollis
- Ellychnia simplex
- Ellychnia variegata
