= Haplocauda =

Scientific classification
- Kingdom: Animalia
- Phylum: Arthropoda
- Class: Insecta
- Order: Coleoptera
- Suborder: Polyphaga
- Infraorder: Elateriformia
- Family: Lampyridae
- Tribe: Photinini
- Genus: Haplocauda; Silveira, Lima, and McHugh, 2022

Genus of beetles

Haplocauda is a genus of fireflies from South America.

== Species list ==
- Haplocauda aculeata Zeballos and Silveira, 2025
- Haplocauda albertinoi Silveira, Lima, and McHugh, 2022
- Haplocauda amazonensis Zeballos and Silveira, 2025
- Haplocauda antimary Zeballos and Silveira, 2025
- Haplocauda lata Zeballos and Silveira, 2025
- Haplocauda mendesi Silveira, Lima, and McHugh, 2022
- Haplocauda yasuni Silveira, Lima, and McHugh, 2022
