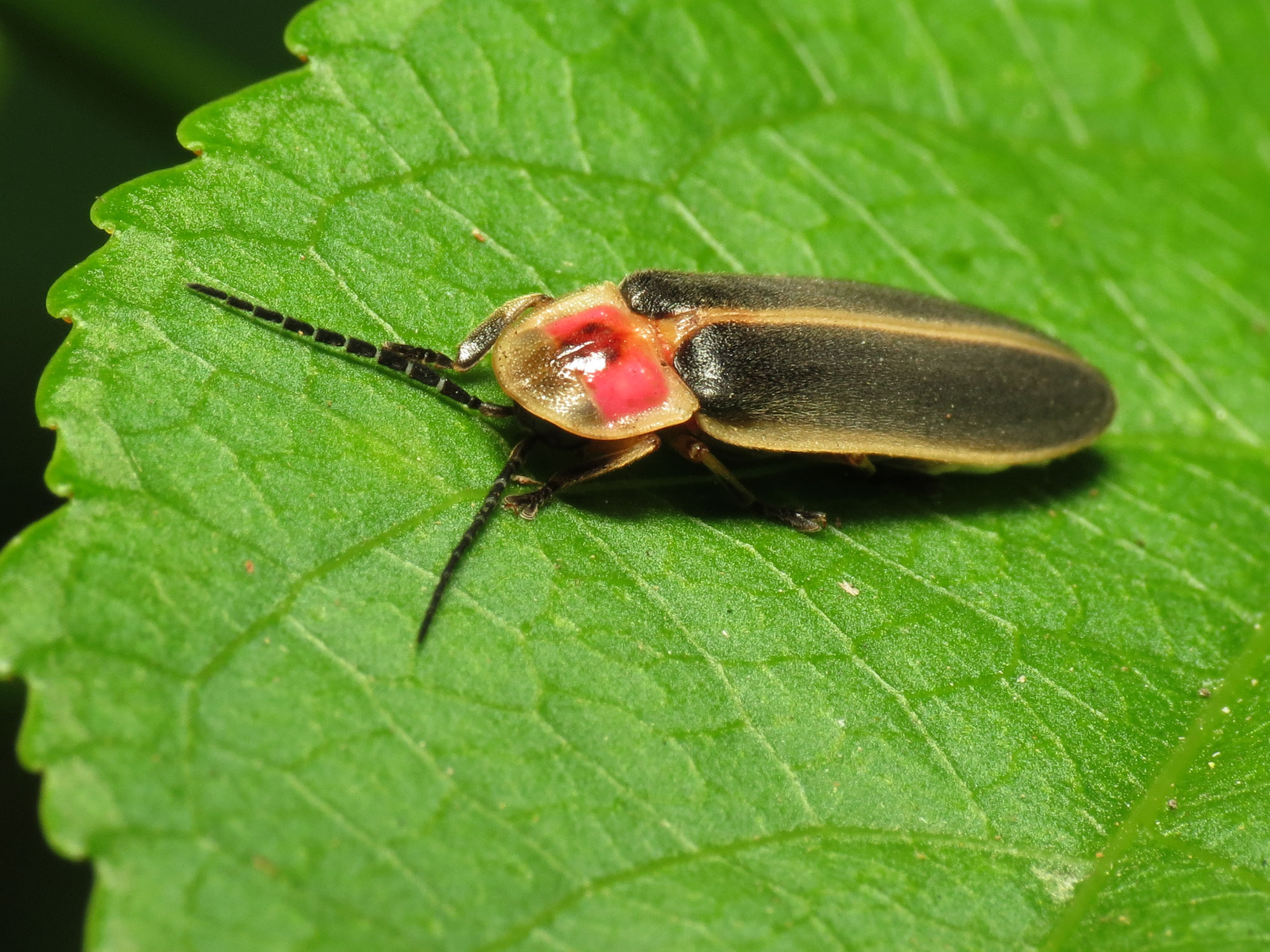
- Eastern firefly, Photinus pyralis

Scientific classification
- Kingdom: Animalia
- Phylum: Arthropoda
- Clade: Pancrustacea
- Class: Insecta
- Order: Coleoptera
- Suborder: Polyphaga
- Infraorder: Elateriformia
- Family: Lampyridae
- Subfamily: Lampyrinae
- Tribe: Photinini; LeConte, 1881

Synonyms
- Lucidotini Lacordaire, 1857

= Photinini =

Tribe of beetles

The Photinini are a large tribe of fireflies in the subfamily Lampyrinae. Photinus pyralis is famous in biotechnology for its luciferase gene. This is sometimes employed as a marker gene; genetically modified organisms which contain it start to glow like the firefly when brought in contact with a luciferin-containing medium. Firefly luciferases differ slightly between taxa, resulting in differently colored light and other properties, and in most cases where "firefly luciferase" is used in some application or study, it is the specific luciferase of P. pyralis.

== Systematics ==
The group has recently been examined using molecular phylogenetics, using fairly comprehensive sampling.

== Genera ==
- Ankonophallus Zaragoza-Caballero & Navarrete-Heredia, 2014
- Aorphallus Zaragoza-Caballero & Gutierrez-Carranza, 2018
- Callopisma Motschulsky, 1853
- Calotrechelum Pic, 1930
- Dadophora Olivier, 1907
- Dilychnia Motschulsky, 1853
- Ellychnia LeConte, 1851
- Erythrolychnia Motschulsky, 1853
- Haplocauda Silveira, Lima, and McHugh, 2022
- Heterophotinus Olivier, 1894
- Jamphotus Barber, 1941
- Lucidina Gorham, 1883
- Lucidota Laporte, 1833
- Lucidotopsis McDermott, 1960
- Luciuranus Silveira, Khattar & Mermudes, 2016
- Macrolampis Motschulsky, 1853
- Microdiphot Barber, 1941
- Mimophotinus Pic, 1935
- Oliviereus Pic, 1930
- Phosphaenopterus Schaufuss, 1870
- Phosphaenus Fourcroy, 1785
- Photinoides McDermott, 1963
- Photinus Laporte, 1833 – rover fireflies (possibly paraphyletic)
- Platylampis Motschulsky, 1853
- Pseudolychnuris Motschulsky, 1853
- Pyropyga Motschulsky, 1852
- Pyropygodes Zaragoza-Caballero, 2000
- Robopus Motschulsky, 1853
- Rufolychnia Kazantsev, 2006
- Uanauna Campello-Gonçalves, Souto, Mermudes & Silviera, 2019
- Ybytyramoan Silveira & Mermudes, 2014
