= Insect olfactory receptor =

Insect olfactory receptors (also known as odorant receptors, ORs) are expressed in the cell membranes of the olfactory sensory neurons of insects. Similarly to mammalian olfactory receptors, in insects each olfactory sensory neuron expresses one type of OR, allowing the specific detection of a volatile chemical.

In contrast to vertebrate ORs, which are seven transmembrane G protein coupled receptors (GPCRs), insect ORs are part of an unrelated group of ligand-gated ion channels. Like GPCRs, insect ORs are transmembrane proteins with seven transmembrane helices, but with a reversed topology, with an intracellular N-terminus and an extracellular C-terminus. Differently to mammalian ORs, insect ORs form a heteromer with a fixed monomer, Orco, and a variable OR monomer, which confers the odour specificity.

The number of ORs in different species of insects is extremely variable ranging from as few as 8 in the damselfly, to 60 in the fruit fly Drosophila melanogaster, even to more than 500 in some ant species, reflecting the variability in odorant perception requirements associated to different lifestyles and social interactions.

Insect ORs are investigated as targets for pest control given the possibility of altering the behaviour of insects by activating particular ORs with natural or optimized chemicals.
