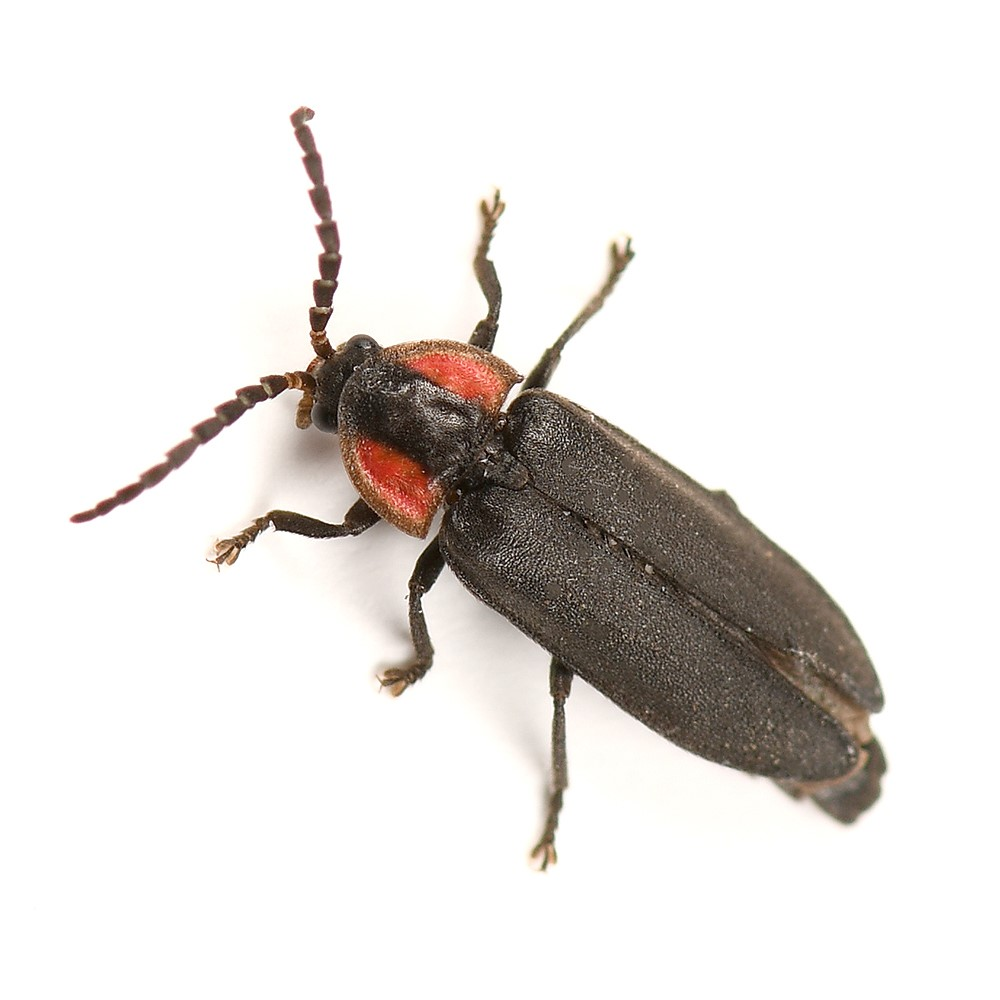

Conservation status
- Least Concern (IUCN 3.1)

- Secure (NatureServe)

Scientific classification
- Kingdom: Animalia
- Phylum: Arthropoda
- Clade: Pancrustacea
- Class: Insecta
- Order: Coleoptera
- Suborder: Polyphaga
- Infraorder: Elateriformia
- Family: Lampyridae
- Genus: Pyropyga
- Species: P. nigricans

Binomial name
- Pyropyga nigricans (Say, 1823)

Synonyms
- Lampyris nigricans Say, 1823

= Pyropyga nigricans =

Species of beetle

Pyropyga nigricans, also known as the black-bordered elf firefly, is a species of diurnal beetle in the family Lampyridae. It is widespread in western North America and occurs from central and eastern Mexico to Canada.
