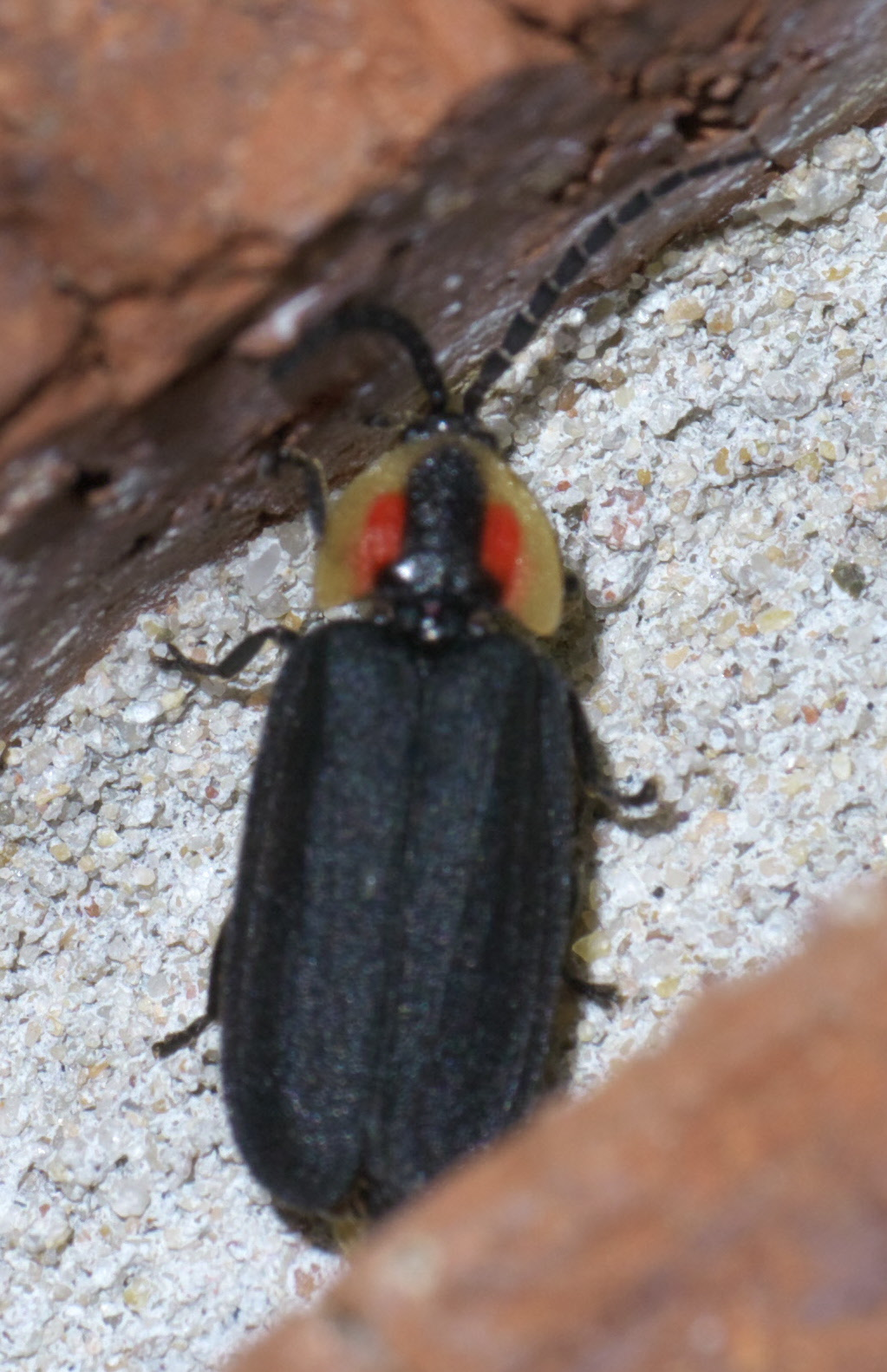
- Lucidota atra

Scientific classification
- Domain: Eukaryota
- Kingdom: Animalia
- Phylum: Arthropoda
- Class: Insecta
- Order: Coleoptera
- Suborder: Polyphaga
- Infraorder: Elateriformia
- Family: Lampyridae
- Tribe: Photinini
- Genus: Lucidota; Laporte, 1833

Diversity
- at least 160 species

= Lucidota =

Genus of beetles

Lucidota is a genus of fireflies in the beetle family Lampyridae. There are more than 160 described species in Lucidota.

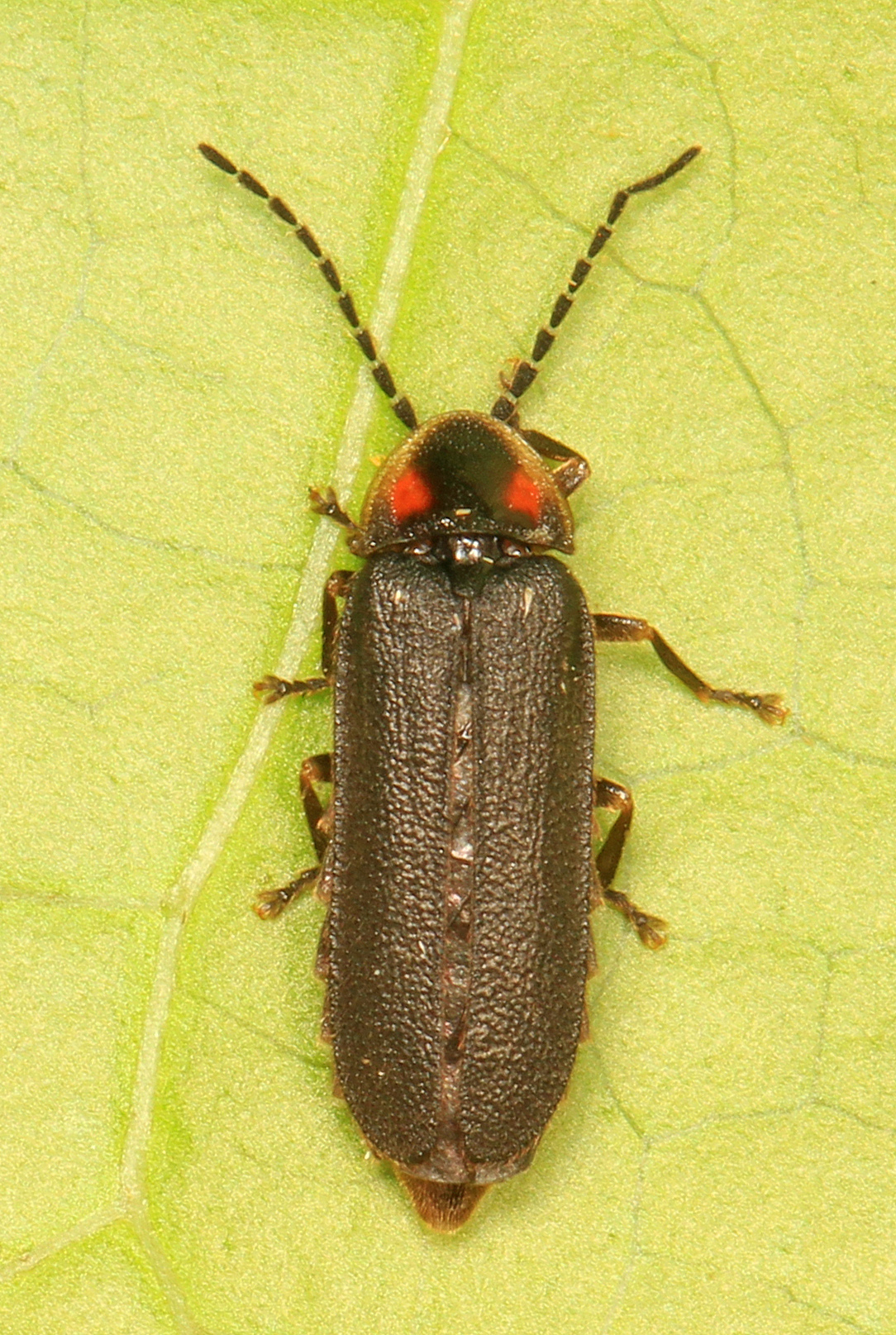
Lucidota punctata

== See also ==
- List of Lucidota species
