= List of Leia species =

These 175 species belong to Leia, a genus of fungus gnats in the family Mycetophilidae.

== Leia species ==
- Leia aculeolusa Wu, 2002^{c g}
- Leia albicincta Meijere, 1924^{c g}
- Leia albicoxa Enderlein, 1910^{c g}
- Leia amabilis Williston, 1900^{c g}
- Leia amapaensis Lane, 1959^{c g}
- Leia ampulliforma Wu, 2002^{c g}
- Leia andirai Lane, 1950^{c g}
- Leia annae (Lindner, 1958)^{c g}
- Leia annulicornis (Brunetti, 1912)^{c g}
- Leia apicalis (Kertesz, 1902)^{c}
- Leia apinagei Lane, 1950^{c g}
- Leia arcuata Brunetti, 1912^{c g}
- Leia arsona Hutson, 1978^{c g}
- Leia aruaci Lane, 1950^{c g}
- Leia autumnata Ostroverkhova & Grishina, 1974^{c g}
- Leia barbarae (Lindner, 1958)^{c g}
- Leia basilewskyi Tollet, 1956^{c g}
- Leia beckeri Landrock, 1940^{c g}
- Leia biamputata Edwards, 1933^{c g}
- Leia bicolor (Fisher, 1939)^{c}
- Leia bilineata (Winnertz, 1863)^{c g}
- Leia bilunula Wiedemann, 1828^{c g}
- Leia bimaculata (Walker, 1848)^{c g}
- Leia biparitta Lynch Arribalzaga, 1892^{c g}
- Leia bipunctata Fisher, 1939^{c g}
- Leia bisetosa Edwards, 1928^{c g}
- Leia biumbaensis Tollet, 1956^{c g}
- Leia bivittata Say, 1829^{i c g b}
- Leia borealis Winnertz^{g}
- Leia borgmeieri Lane, 1959^{c g}
- Leia bururiensis Tollet, 1956^{c g}
- Leia cayapoi Lane, 1950^{c g}
- Leia cincta (Coquillett, 1895)^{i c g}
- Leia cincticauda Enderlein, 1910^{c g}
- Leia circumfera Fisher, 1939^{c g}
- Leia collarigera Enderlein, 1910^{c g}
- Leia completa (Kertesz, 1902)^{c g}
- Leia concinna Williston, 1896^{c g}
- Leia continua Tollet, 1956^{c g}
- Leia costaricensis Fisher, 1940^{c g}
- Leia crucigera Zetterstedt, 1838^{c g}
- Leia cuneola (Adams, 1903)^{i c g}
- Leia cylindrica (Winnertz, 1863)^{c g}
- Leia decora (Loew, 1869)^{i c g}
- Leia delobeli Matile, 1993^{c g}
- Leia determinaticollis Enderlein, 1910^{c g}
- Leia dichroma Freeman, 1951^{c g}
- Leia diplechina Wu, 2003^{c g}
- Leia disgrega Edwards, 1933^{c g}
- Leia diversipes Edwards, 1933^{c g}
- Leia divesicornis (Kertesz, 1902)^{c g}
- Leia dryas Johannsen, 1912^{i c g}
- Leia elegans (Kertesz, 1902)^{c g}
- Leia falculata Edwards, 1933^{c g}
- Leia fasciata (Kertesz, 1902)^{c g}
- Leia fascipennis Meigen, 1818^{c g}
- Leia fisherae Shaw, 1950^{c g}
- Leia flavipennis Lastovka & Matile, 1974^{c g}
- Leia flavobrunnea Brunetti, 1912^{c g}
- Leia flavolimbata (Brunetti, 1912)^{c g}
- Leia flavoscutellata Lynch Arribalzaga, 1892^{c g}
- Leia fontana Chandler, 2004^{c g}
- Leia fulva (Walker, 1856)^{c g}
- Leia fuscicalcar Edwards, 1928^{c g}
- Leia fuscicornis Edwards, 1941^{g}
- Leia gaudchaui (Lindner, 1958)^{c g}
- Leia graeca Bechev, 1997^{c g}
- Leia guangxiana Wu, 1999^{c g}
- Leia guaycurusi Lane, 1950^{c g}
- Leia hemiata Garrett, 1925^{i c g}
- Leia humeralis (Brunetti, 1912)^{c g}
- Leia hungarica Sevcik & Papp, 2003^{c g}
- Leia hyalina (Coquillett, 1905)^{i c g}
- Leia immaculata (Giglio-Tos, 1891)^{c g}
- Leia incompleta Curran, 1928^{c g}
- Leia indica (Brunetti, 1912)^{c}
- Leia innotata Enderlein, 1910^{c g}
- Leia insignis Brunetti, 1912^{c g}
- Leia intermissa Tollet, 1956^{c g}
- Leia interrupta (Kertesz, 1901)^{c g}
- Leia ishitanii Sasakawa, 1994^{c g}
- Leia iturupensis Zaitzev, 2001^{c g}
- Leia jeanneli (Edwards, 1914)^{c}
- Leia junai Lane, 1950^{c g}
- Leia kamijoi Sasakawa, 1964^{c g}
- Leia kaszabi Lastovka & Matile, 1974^{c g}
- Leia leucocera Edwards, 1933^{c g}
- Leia lineola (Adams, 1903)^{i c g}
- Leia longiseta Barendrecht, 1938^{c g}
- Leia longwangshana Wu, 2002^{c g}
- Leia maculosa (Strobl, 1900)^{c g}
- Leia major Edwards, 1933^{c g}
- Leia malleolus Freeman, 1954^{c g}
- Leia martinovskyi Sevcik & Papp, 2003^{c g}
- Leia melaena (Loew, 1869)^{i c g}
- Leia melanoptera Ostroverkhova, 1977^{c g}
- Leia monoleuca Edwards, 1933^{c g}
- Leia montanosilvatica Zaitzev, 1994^{c g}
- Leia muhavuraensis Tollet, 1956^{c g}
- Leia nepalensis Plassmann, 1977^{c g}
- Leia ngorongoroensis Vanschuytbroeck, 1965^{c g}
- Leia nigricans Tollet, 1956^{c g}
- Leia nigricauda Edwards, 1933^{c g}
- Leia nigricornis Van Duzee, 1928^{g}
- Leia nigripalpis Edwards, 1928^{c g}
- Leia nigriventris Edwards, 1932^{c g}
- Leia nigrocornis Van Duzee, 1928^{i c g}
- Leia nigronitida (Edwards, 1914)^{c g}
- Leia nigrospleniata Lynch Arribalzaga, 1892^{c g}
- Leia nitens Williston, 1896^{c g}
- Leia notabilis (Edwards, 1914)^{c g}
- Leia oblectabilis (Loew, 1869)^{i g b}
- Leia oliveirai Lane, 1959^{c g}
- Leia opima (Loew, 1869)^{i c g b}
- Leia orientalis Vanschuytbroeck, 1965^{c g}
- Leia padana Chandler, 2004^{c g}
- Leia paranensis Edwards, 1933^{c g}
- Leia paulensis Edwards, 1933^{c g}
- Leia pauliani Matile, 1969^{c g}
- Leia pedifer Edwards, 1933^{g}
- Leia pedifera Edwards, 1933^{c g}
- Leia picta Meigen, 1830^{c g}
- Leia picticornis (Kertesz, 1902)^{c g}
- Leia piffardi Edwards, 1925^{c g}
- Leia pilosa Okada, 1938^{c g}
- Leia plaumanni Lane, 1959^{c g}
- Leia plebeja Johannsen, 1912^{i c g}
- Leia poeciloptera Philippi, 1865^{c g}
- Leia punctata Bellardi, 1862^{c g}
- Leia punctiformis Fisher, 1939^{c g}
- Leia ravida Wu, 1999^{c g}
- Leia rubrithorax Okada, 1939^{c g}
- Leia rufiptera Ostroverkhova, 1977^{c g}
- Leia rufithorax Freeman, 1951^{c g}
- Leia rwankeriensis Tollet, 1956^{c g}
- Leia salobrensis Edwards, 1941^{c g}
- Leia schmidti Fisher, 1939^{c g}
- Leia schnusei Edwards, 1933^{c g}
- Leia setosa Matile, 1973^{c g}
- Leia setosicauda Edwards, 1933^{c g}
- Leia smithi Edwards, 1933^{c g}
- Leia spinifer Edwards, 1933^{g}
- Leia spinifera Edwards, 1933^{c g}
- Leia stelviana Kurina, 2008^{c g}
- Leia stigmatica Edwards, 1925^{c g}
- Leia stonei Lane, 1958^{c g}
- Leia striata (Williston, 1893)^{i c g}
- Leia subfasciata (Meigen, 1818)^{c g}
- Leia sublunata (Loew, 1869)^{i c g b}
- Leia submaculipennis Freeman, 1954^{c g}
- Leia subtrifasciata (Strobl, 1906)^{c g}
- Leia thomensis Edwards, 1934^{c g}
- Leia tropicalis Fisher, 1939^{c g}
- Leia truncatovenosa Enderlein, 1910^{c g}
- Leia umbrosa Caspers, 1991^{c g}
- Leia uncinata Ostroverkhova & Grishina, 1974^{c g}
- Leia unicolor (Winnertz, 1863)^{c g}
- Leia varia Walker, 1848^{i c g b}
- Leia ventralis Say, 1824^{i c g b}
- Leia winthemi Lehmann, 1822^{c g}
- Leia yangi Wu, 1997^{c g}
- † Leia aberrans Statz, 1944^{g}
- † Leia crassipalpis (Meunier, 1904)^{g}
- † Leia crassiuscula (Förster, 1891)^{g}
- † Leia curvipetiolata (Meunier, 1904)^{g}
- † Leia exhumata Statz, 1944^{g}
- † Leia frequens (Loew, 1850)^{g}
- † Leia gracillima (Förster, 1891)^{g}
- † Leia longipalpis (Meunier, 1904)^{g}
- † Leia longipes (Förster, 1891)^{g}
- † Leia longipetiolata (Meunier, 1904)^{g}
- † Leia miocenica Cockerell, 1911^{g}
- † Leia platypus (Loew, 1850)^{g}
- † Leia vetusta (Meunier, 1919)^{g}

Data sources: i = ITIS, c = Catalogue of Life, g = GBIF, b = Bugguide.net
