= Keroplatus testaceus =

Scientific classification
- Domain: Eukaryota
- Kingdom: Animalia
- Phylum: Arthropoda
- Class: Insecta
- Order: Diptera
- Family: Keroplatidae
- Genus: Keroplatus
- Species: K. testaceus

Binomial name
- Keroplatus testaceus (Dalman, 1818)

Species of fly

Keroplatus testaceus is a species of fungus gnats belonging to the family Keroplatidae.

It is native to Eurasia. Hans-Jürgen Stammer discovered that the larvae and pupae are bioluminescent, and attributed the light production to the fat body.
