= Keroplatus clausus =

Scientific classification
- Domain: Eukaryota
- Kingdom: Animalia
- Phylum: Arthropoda
- Class: Insecta
- Order: Diptera
- Family: Keroplatidae
- Subfamily: Keroplatinae
- Genus: Keroplatus
- Species: K. clausus

Binomial name
- Keroplatus clausus Coquillett, 1901

Synonyms
- Keroplatus fernaldi Shaw, 1941

Species of fly

Keroplatus clausus is a species of predatory fungus gnats in the family Keroplatidae.
