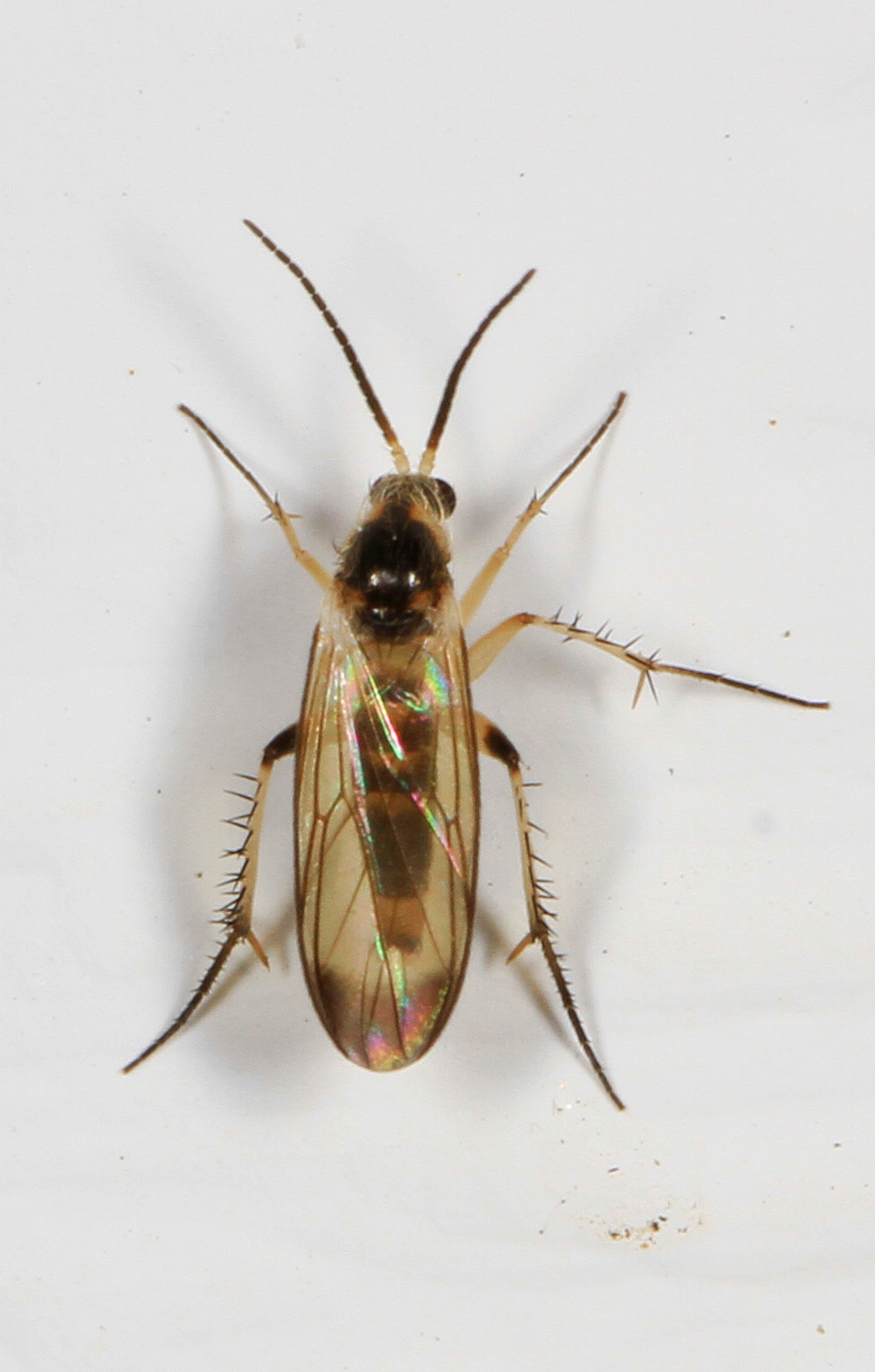
- Rondaniella dimidiata

Scientific classification
- Domain: Eukaryota
- Kingdom: Animalia
- Phylum: Arthropoda
- Class: Insecta
- Order: Diptera
- Family: Mycetophilidae
- Subfamily: Leiinae
- Genus: Rondaniella; Johannsen, 1909

= Rondaniella =

Genus of flies

Rondaniella is a genus of fungus gnats in the family Mycetophilidae. There are about nine described species in Rondaniella.

== Species ==
These nine species belong to the genus Rondaniella:

- R. aspidoida Yu & Wu, 2004
- R. dimidiata (Meigen, 1804)
- R. gutianshanana Yu & Wu, 2008
- R. japonica (Matsumura, 1915)
- R. rufiseta Edwards, 1932
- R. schistocauda Yu & Wu, 2004
- R. simplex Yu & Wu, 2008
- R. unguiculata Yu & Wu, 2008
- † L. interrupta (Loew, 1850)
