= Dismals Canyon =

Sandstone gorge near Phil Campbell, Franklin County, Alabama, United States

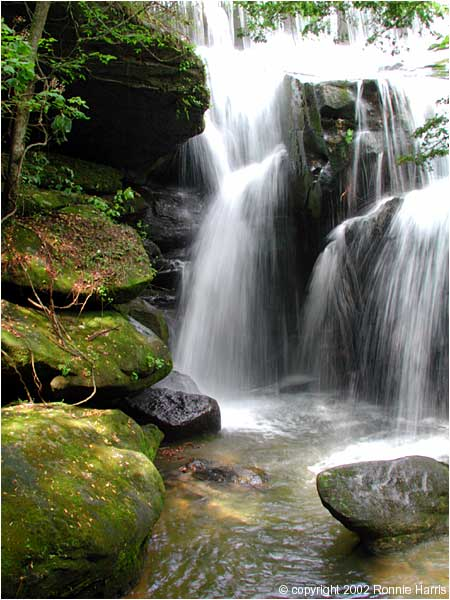
- Rainbow Falls at Dismals Canyon near Phil Campbell in Franklin County, Alabama.

- Location within Alabama Location within the United States
- Location: Franklin County, Alabama
- Nearest city: Phil Campbell
- Coordinates: 34°19′30.65″N 87°46′54.21″W
- Area: 85 acres (34 ha)
- Website: Official website

U.S. National Natural Landmark
- Designated: May 1974

Dismals Canyon is a sandstone gorge near Phil Campbell in Franklin County, Alabama. It was declared a National Natural Landmark in May 1974.

Dismals Canyon is one of only a few places where insects called dismalites (Orfelia fultoni, a distant relative of Arachnocampa) can be found. The larval forms of these flies emit a bright blue-green light to attract food and mates. They cover the canyon wall.

The canyon is home to two waterfalls, Secret Falls and Rainbow Falls, and six natural bridges.

Dismals Canyon is operated commercially as part of an 85-acre (34 ha) nature preserve, and a fee is charged for entry. Night tours are conducted to view the dismalites. Camping is available in both traditional campsites and in cabins.

== Historical connections ==
Chickasaw Native Americans were held captive in the canyon for two weeks before embarking on a forced journey along the Trail of Tears.

== In film ==
The location was used to film a segment for the Discovery Channel documentary When Dinosaurs Roamed America. That segment was set in Late Cretaceous New Mexico (Moreno Hill Formation).

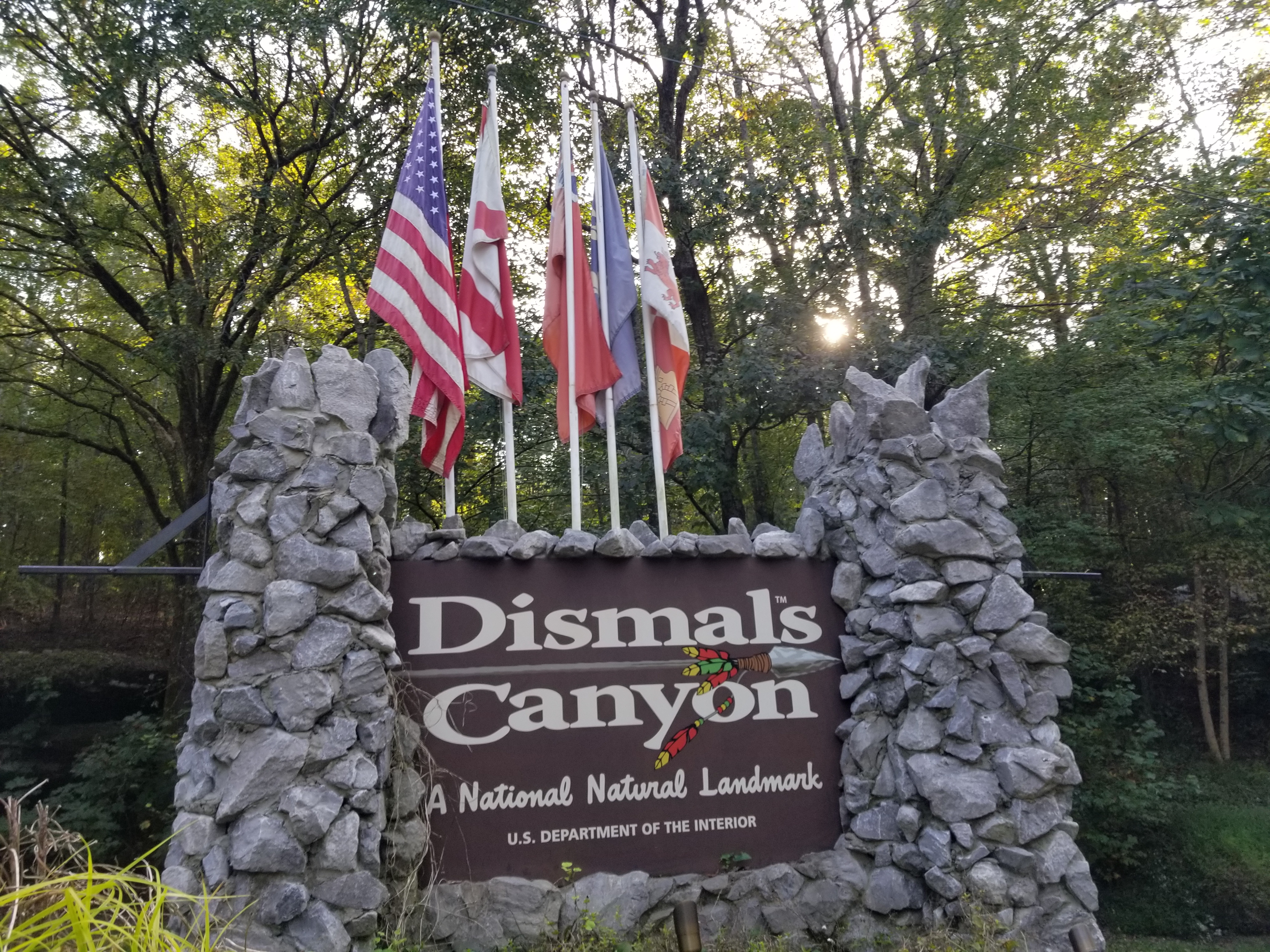
Sign welcoming visitors to Dismals Canyon
