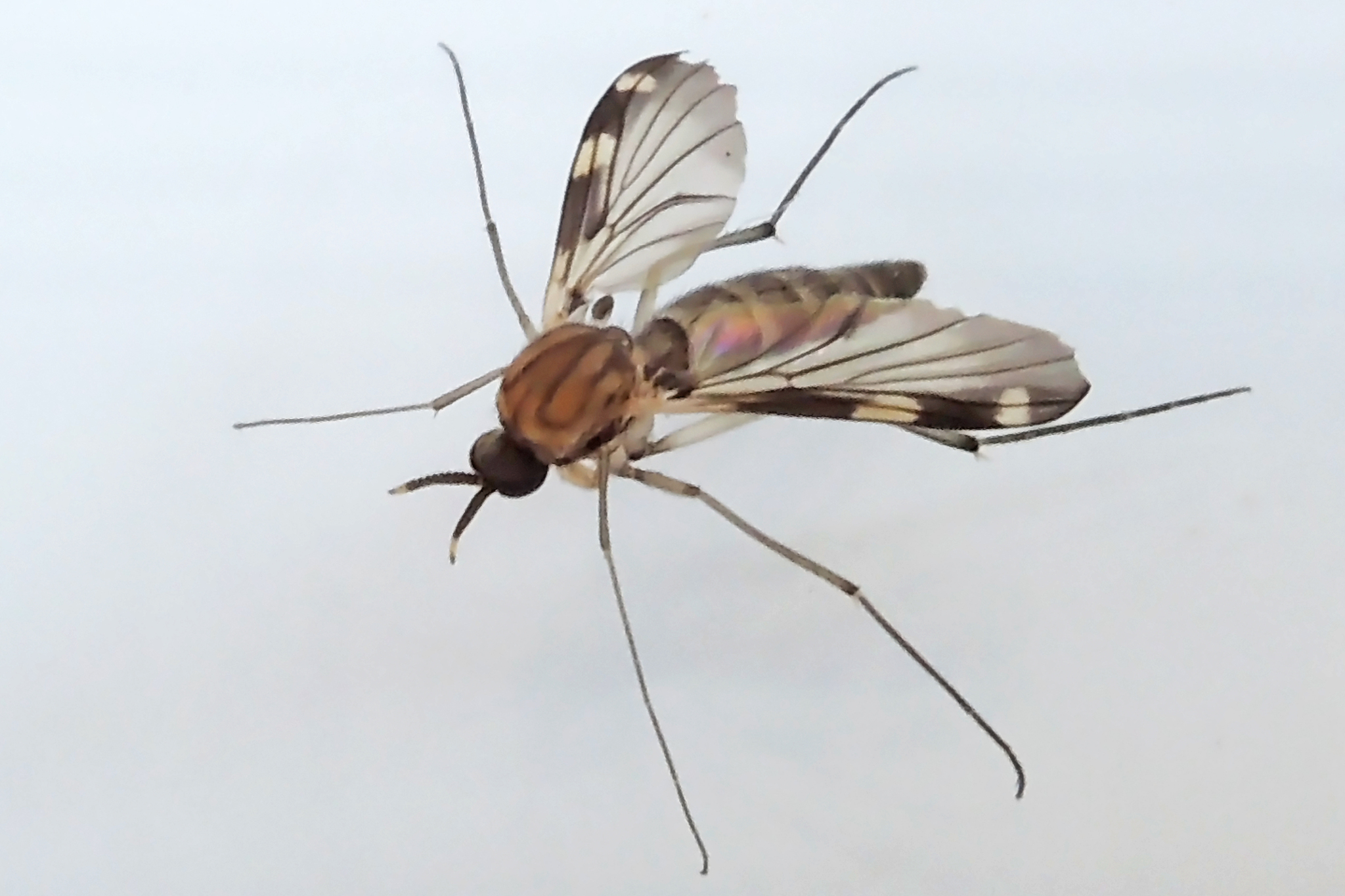

Scientific classification
- Kingdom: Animalia
- Phylum: Arthropoda
- Class: Insecta
- Order: Diptera
- Family: Keroplatidae
- Genus: Heteropterna
- Species: H. cressoni

Binomial name
- Heteropterna cressoni (Fisher, 1941)

Synonyms
- Keroplatus cressoni Fisher, 1941

= Heteropterna cressoni =

Species of fly

Heteropterna cressoni is a species of predatory fungus gnat in the family Keroplatidae.
