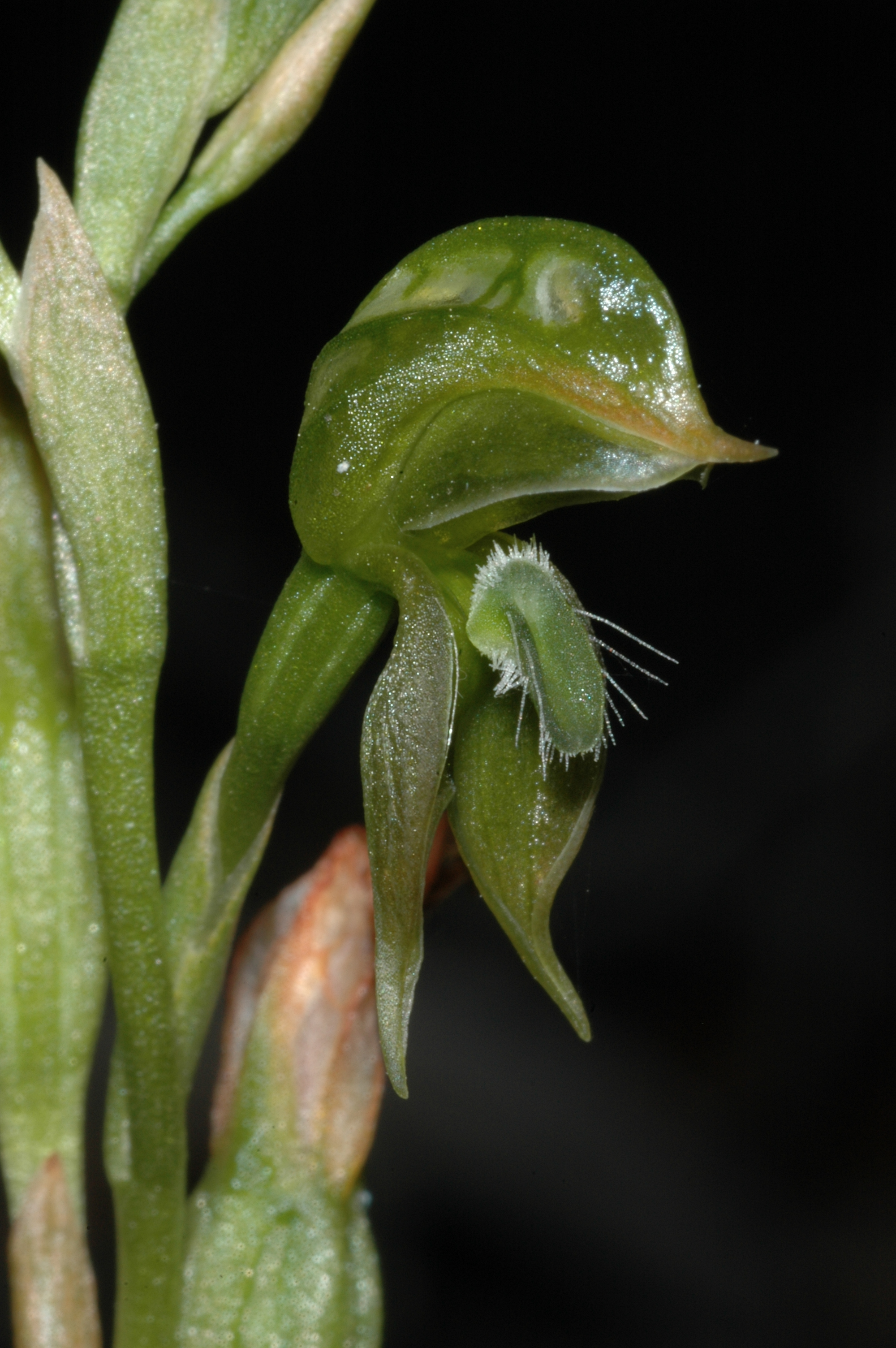
- Near Steiglitz

Conservation status
- Least Concern (IUCN 3.1)

Scientific classification
- Kingdom: Plantae
- Clade: Tracheophytes
- Clade: Angiosperms
- Clade: Monocots
- Order: Asparagales
- Family: Orchidaceae
- Subfamily: Orchidoideae
- Tribe: Cranichideae
- Genus: Pterostylis
- Species: P. squamata

Binomial name
- Pterostylis squamata R.Br.

Synonyms
- Oligochaetochilus squamata Szlach. orth. var.; Oligochaetochilus squamatus (R.Br.) Szlach.; Pterostylis aff. rufa; Pterostylis dichaeta Rchb.f. nom. inval., pro syn.; Pterostylis rufa var. squamata (R.Br.) Fitzg.; Pterostylis sp. F; Pterostylis sp. aff. rufa; Pterostylis squamata R.Br. var. squamata; Pterostylis rufa auct. non R.Br.: Curtis, W.M. (1980), Angiospermae: Orchidaceae. The Student's Flora of Tasmania 4A: 24

= Pterostylis squamata =

Southern rustyhood

Species of orchid

Pterostylis squamata, commonly known as southern rustyhood or ruddyhood, is a plant in the orchid family Orchidaceae and is endemic to south-eastern Australia. Flowering plants have up to ten translucent green flowers with reddish-brown markings and a hairy, insect-like labellum. Non-flowering plants have a rosette of four to eight egg-shaped leaves. This species is very similar to Pterostylis rufa which has a narrower labellum and other minor differences.

== Description ==
Pterostylis squamata, is a terrestrial, perennial, deciduous, herb with an underground tuber. Non-flowering plants have a rosette of between four and eight oblong leaves, each leaf 10–30 mm (0.4–1 in) long and 7–12 mm (0.3–0.5 in) wide. Flowering plants have up to ten translucent green flowers with reddish-green markings, on a flowering spike 100–300 mm (4–10 in) high. There are between two and six stem leaves wrapped around the flowering spike. The dorsal sepal and petals are fused, forming a hood or "galea" over the column with the dorsal sepal having an upturned, thread-like tip about 2 mm (0.08 in) long. The lateral sepals are about the same width as the galea, egg-shaped and turned downwards, joined for part of their length and taper to a narrow or thread-like tip 4–7 mm (0.2–0.3 in) long. The labellum is insect-like, about 4 mm (0.2 in) long, 2 mm (0.08 in) wide, dark reddish brown and fleshy. There are five to seven hairs up to 2 mm (0.08 in)on each side of the labellum and many shorter hairs on the "head" end. Flowering occurs from October to March.

== Taxonomy and naming ==
Pterostylis squamata was first formally described in 1810 by Robert Brown and the description was published in the Prodromus Florae Novae Hollandiae et Insulae Van Diemen. The specific epithet (squamata) is a Latin word meaning "scaly".

== Distribution and habitat ==
Southern rustyhood grows in heath, woodland and forest, often near rock outcrops south from the Brindabella Range in New South Wales and the Australian Capital Territory, scattered across Victoria and widespread in Tasmania.
