= Leia opima =

Scientific classification
- Domain: Eukaryota
- Kingdom: Animalia
- Phylum: Arthropoda
- Class: Insecta
- Order: Diptera
- Family: Mycetophilidae
- Genus: Leia
- Species: L. opima

Binomial name
- Leia opima (Loew, 1869)

Synonyms
- Glaphyroptera opima Loew, 1869

Species of fly

Leia opima is a species of fungus gnats in the family Mycetophilidae.
