= Keroplatus militaris =

Scientific classification
- Domain: Eukaryota
- Kingdom: Animalia
- Phylum: Arthropoda
- Class: Insecta
- Order: Diptera
- Family: Keroplatidae
- Genus: Keroplatus
- Species: K. militaris

Binomial name
- Keroplatus militaris Johannsen, 1910

Species of fly

Keroplatus militaris is a species of predatory fungus gnats in the family Keroplatidae.
