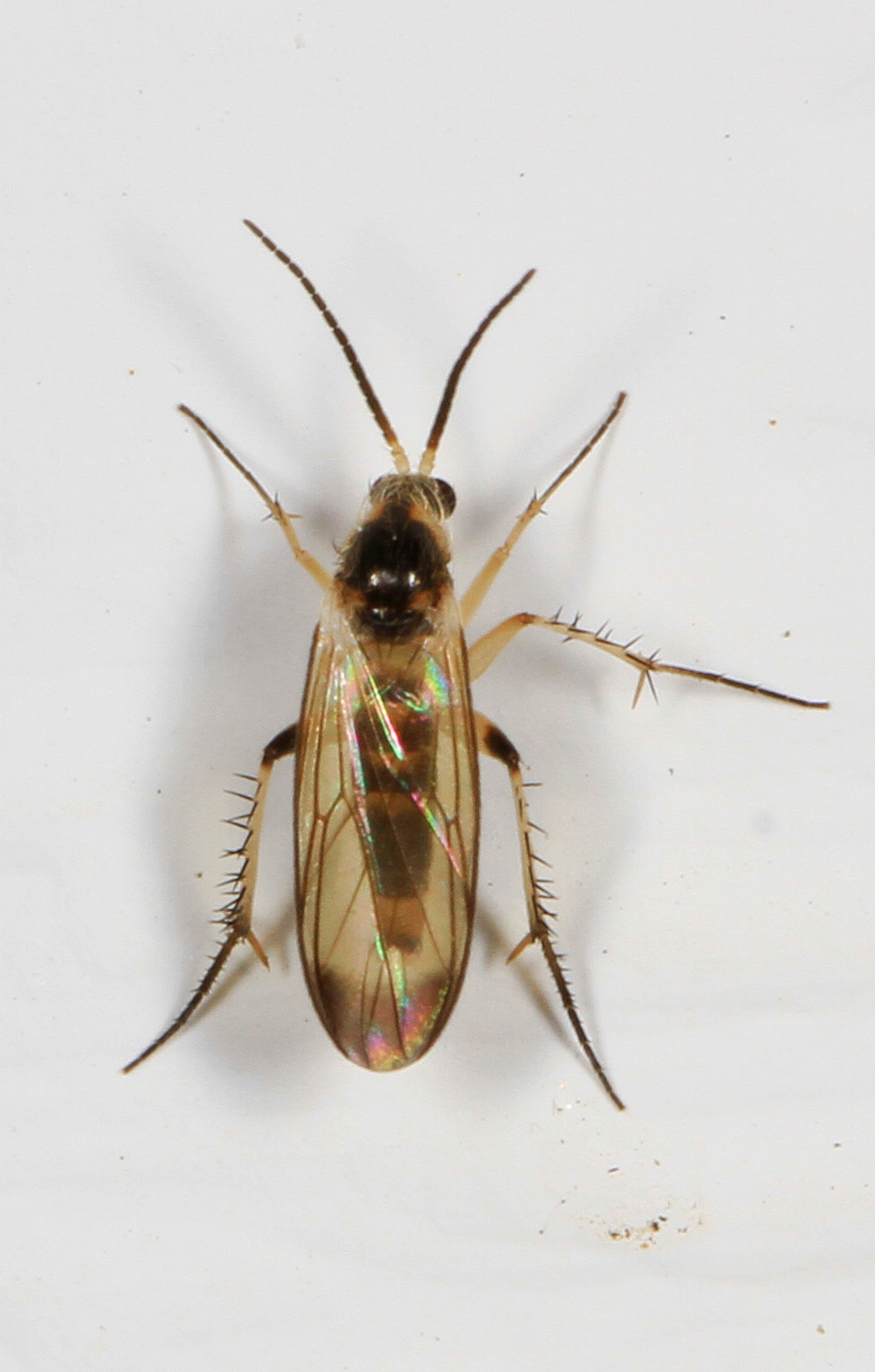

Scientific classification
- Domain: Eukaryota
- Kingdom: Animalia
- Phylum: Arthropoda
- Class: Insecta
- Order: Diptera
- Family: Mycetophilidae
- Genus: Rondaniella
- Species: R. dimidiata

Binomial name
- Rondaniella dimidiata (Meigen, 1804)

Synonyms
- Leia abbreviata Loew, 1869; Leia sororcula Loew, 1869; Mycetophila dimidiata Meigen, 1804

= Rondaniella dimidiata =

Species of fly

Rondaniella dimidiata is a species of fungus gnat in the family Mycetophilidae.
