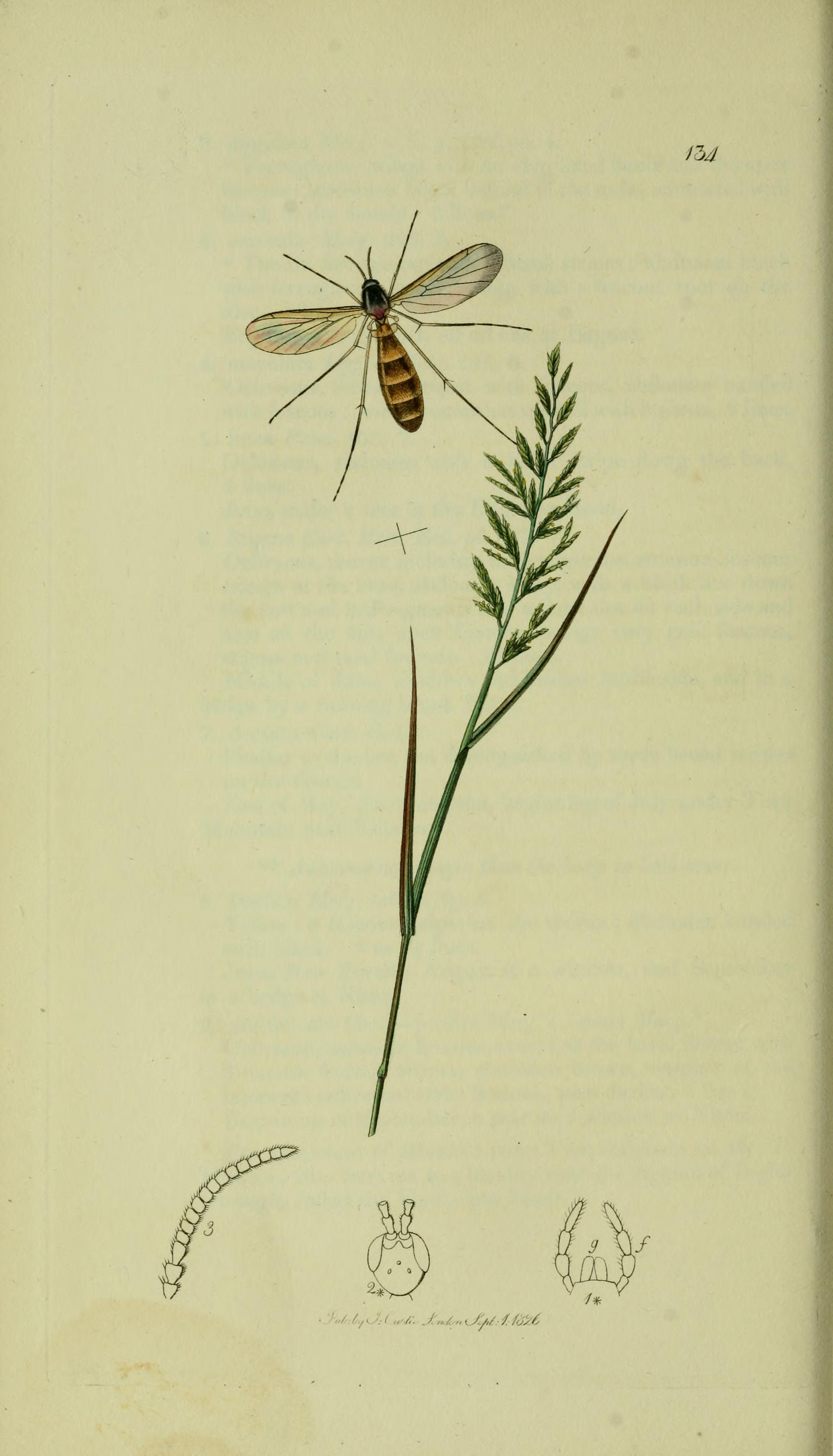
- Orfelia nemoralis in British Entomology

Scientific classification
- Kingdom: Animalia
- Phylum: Arthropoda
- Class: Insecta
- Order: Diptera
- Family: Keroplatidae
- Genus: Orfelia
- Species: O. nemoralis

Binomial name
- Orfelia nemoralis Meigen, 1818

= Orfelia nemoralis =

Species of fly

Orfelia nemoralis is a Palearctic species of 'fungus gnats' in the family Keroplatidae. The larvae of Orfelia are mycetophagous and live in decaying wood or other organic debris overgrown by fungal plant substrates.
