= Leia sublunata =

Scientific classification
- Domain: Eukaryota
- Kingdom: Animalia
- Phylum: Arthropoda
- Class: Insecta
- Order: Diptera
- Family: Mycetophilidae
- Genus: Leia
- Species: L. sublunata

Binomial name
- Leia sublunata (Loew, 1869)

Synonyms
- Glaphyroptera sublunata Loew, 1869

Species of fly

Leia sublunata is a species of fungus gnat in the family Mycetophilidae.
