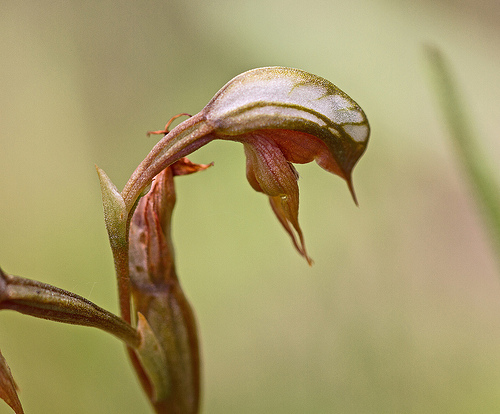
- Pterostylis rufa growing in the Southern Downs Region

Scientific classification
- Kingdom: Plantae
- Clade: Tracheophytes
- Clade: Angiosperms
- Clade: Monocots
- Order: Asparagales
- Family: Orchidaceae
- Subfamily: Orchidoideae
- Tribe: Cranichideae
- Genus: Pterostylis
- Species: P. rufa

Binomial name
- Pterostylis rufa R.Br.

Synonyms
- Oligochaetochilus rufus (R.Br.) Szlach.

= Pterostylis rufa =

Red rustyhood

Species of orchid

Pterostylis rufa, commonly known as the red rustyhood is a plant in the orchid family Orchidaceae and is endemic to south-eastern Australia. It has a rosette of leaves and up to fifteen bright reddish-brown flowers with translucent white "windows" and a dark brown, insect-like labellum. It occurs from southern Queensland to south-eastern South Australia.

== Description ==
Pterostylis rufa is a terrestrial, perennial, deciduous, herb with an underground tuber. It has a rosette of between five and twelve elliptic to egg-shaped leaves, each leaf 10–30 mm (0.4–1 in) long and 7–13 mm (0.3–0.5 in) wide. Flowering plants have a rosette at the base of the flowering stem and between two and fifteen bright reddish-brown flowers with translucent white panels and which are 16–20 mm (0.6–0.8 in) long and 5–6 mm (0.20–0.24 in) wide, each on a pedicel 5–20 mm (0.2–0.8 in) long. The flowering stem is 80–200 mm (3–8 in) high and there are between three and six stem leaves with their bases wrapped around it. The dorsal sepal and petals are fused to form a hood called the "galea" over the column, with the dorsal sepal having a thread-like tip up to 2 mm (0.08 in) long. The lateral sepals turn downwards, are about the same width as the galea, fused for more than half their length and have narrow tips 7–8 mm (0.28–0.31 in) long and spread apart from each other. The labellum is reddish-brown and insect-like, about 4 mm (0.2 in) long and 2 mm (0.08 in) wide. The "head" end is thickened, has many short white hairs and there are between four or five longer hairs on each side of the "body". Flowering occurs from September to November.

== Taxonomy and naming ==
Pterostylis rufa was first formally described in 1810 by Robert Brown and the description was published in Prodromus Florae Novae Hollandiae et Insulae Van Diemen. The specific epithet (rufa) is a Latin word meaning "red" or "reddish".

== Distribution and habitat ==
The red rustyhood widespread and locally common, growing in heathy woodland and open forest, often in shallow soil in rocky places. It occurs from the Darling Downs through eastern New South Wales, in scattered populations across Victoria and rarely in far south-eastern South Australia.

== Ecology ==
Flowers of P. rufa are pollinated by fungus gnats of the species Orfelia.
