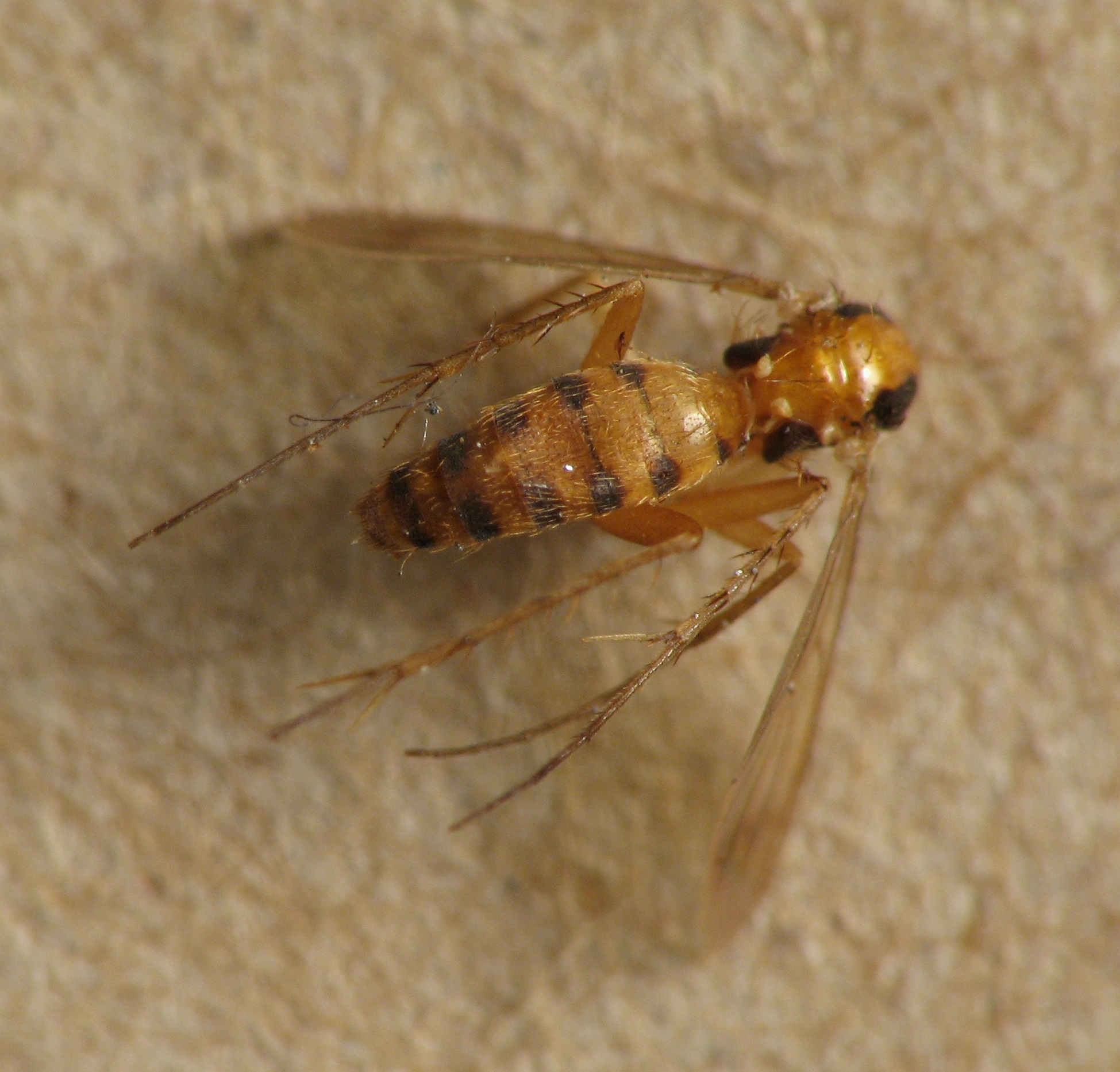

Scientific classification
- Domain: Eukaryota
- Kingdom: Animalia
- Phylum: Arthropoda
- Class: Insecta
- Order: Diptera
- Family: Mycetophilidae
- Genus: Leia
- Species: L. bivittata

Binomial name
- Leia bivittata Say, 1829

Synonyms
- Glaphyroptera lateralis Wulp, 1867

= Leia bivittata =

Species of fly

Leia bivittata is a species of fungus gnats in the family Mycetophilidae.
