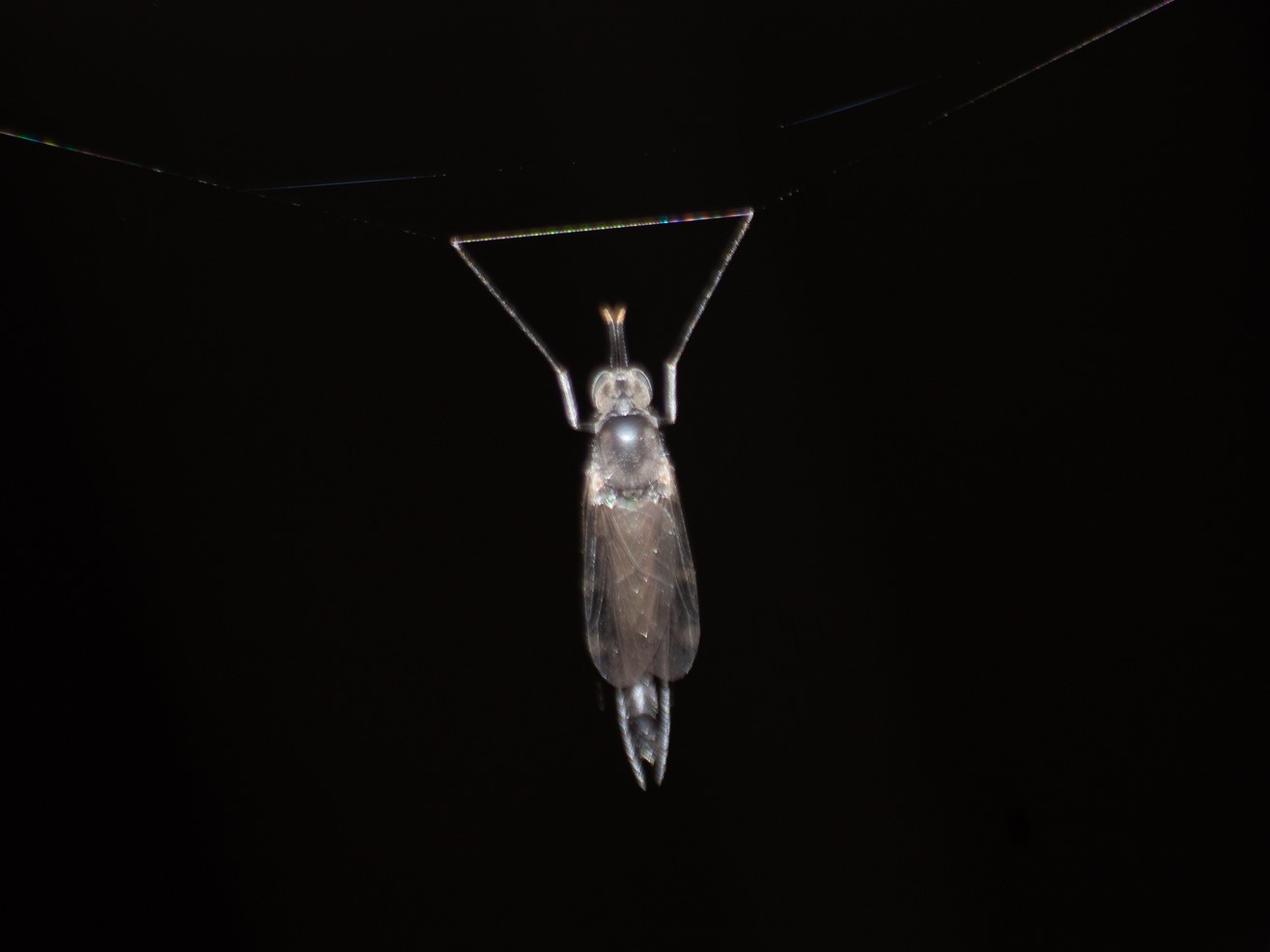

Scientific classification
- Kingdom: Animalia
- Phylum: Arthropoda
- Class: Insecta
- Order: Diptera
- Family: Keroplatidae
- Genus: Heteropterna; Skuse, 1888

= Heteropterna =

Genus of flies

Heteropterna is a genus of predatory fungus gnats in the family Keroplatidae. There are at least 20 described species in the genus Heteropterna.

== Species ==
These 25 species belong to the genus Heteropterna:

- H. abdominalis Lane, 1948^{c g}
- H. affinis Skuse, 1890^{c g}
- H. annulipes (Colless, 1966)^{c g}
- H. balachowskyi Matile, 1970^{c g}
- H. caraibeana Matile, 1982^{c g}
- H. chazeaui Matile, 1988^{c g}
- H. cressoni (Fisher, 1941)^{i c g}
- H. fenestralis Matile, 1990^{c g}
- H. flavovittata Matile, 1990^{c g}
- H. gagnei Matile, 1990^{c g}
- H. ghesquierei Tollet, 1955^{c g}
- H. imperfecta Matile, 1982^{c g}
- H. interrupta Matile, 1990^{c g}
- H. laterociliata Matile, 1990^{c g}
- H. macleayi Skuse, 1888^{c g}
- H. major Curran, 1928^{c g}
- H. montana Matile, 1990^{c g}
- H. orozi Papp, 2006^{c g}
- H. perdistincta Matile, 1990^{c g}
- H. septemtrionalis Okada, 1938^{g}
- H. tetraleuca Edwards, 1940^{c g}
- H. thaii Papp, 2006^{c g}
- H. triangularis Matile, 1990^{c g}
- H. trileuca Edwards, 1940^{c g}
- H. vicina Matile, 1990^{c g}

Data sources: i = ITIS, c = Catalogue of Life, g = GBIF, b = Bugguide.net
