= Leia oblectabilis =

Scientific classification
- Domain: Eukaryota
- Kingdom: Animalia
- Phylum: Arthropoda
- Class: Insecta
- Order: Diptera
- Family: Mycetophilidae
- Genus: Leia
- Species: L. oblectabilis

Binomial name
- Leia oblectabilis (Loew, 1869)

Synonyms
- Glaphyroptera oblectabilis Loew, 1869

Species of fly

Leia oblectabilis is a species of fungus gnats in the family Mycetophilidae.
