= Leia ventralis =

Scientific classification
- Domain: Eukaryota
- Kingdom: Animalia
- Phylum: Arthropoda
- Class: Insecta
- Order: Diptera
- Family: Mycetophilidae
- Genus: Leia
- Species: L. ventralis

Binomial name
- Leia ventralis Say, 1824

Species of fly

Leia ventralis is a species of fungus gnats in the family Mycetophilidae.
