= Leia varia =

Scientific classification
- Kingdom: Animalia
- Phylum: Arthropoda
- Class: Insecta
- Order: Diptera
- Family: Mycetophilidae
- Genus: Leia
- Species: L. varia

Binomial name
- Leia varia Walker, 1848

Species of Fungus gnat

Leia varia is a species of fungus gnats in the family Mycetophilidae. Adults are identified by long spurs extending from their tibiae.
