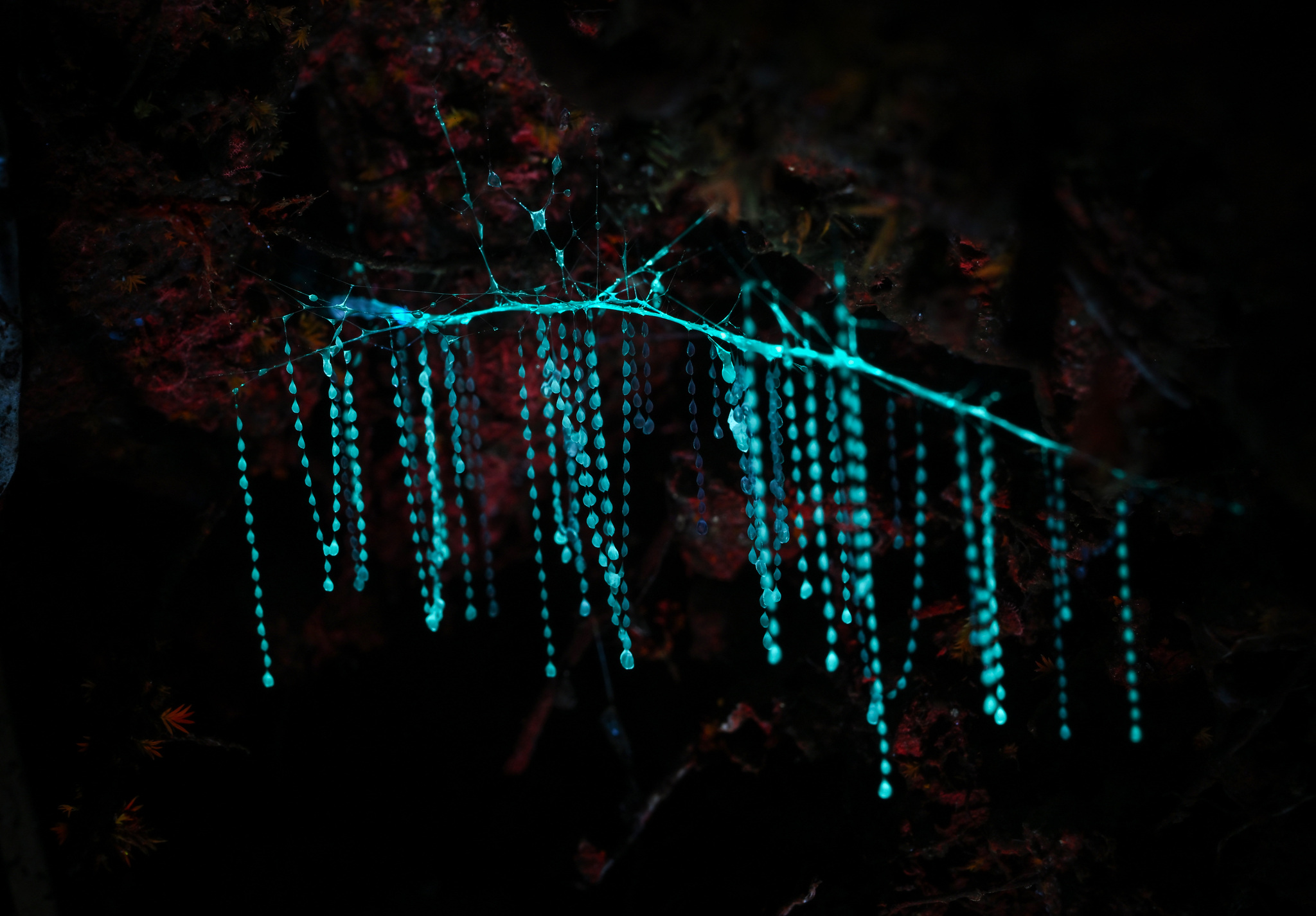
- Glowworm (Arachnocampa luminosa) and silk snares

Scientific classification
- Kingdom: Animalia
- Phylum: Arthropoda
- Clade: Pancrustacea
- Class: Insecta
- Order: Diptera
- Family: Keroplatidae
- Genus: Arachnocampa
- Species: A. luminosa

Binomial name
- Arachnocampa luminosa (Skuse, 1891)

Synonyms
- Bolitophila luminosa

= Arachnocampa luminosa =

Species of fly

Arachnocampa luminosa (Skuse, 1891), commonly known as New Zealand glowworm or simply glowworm, is a species of fungus gnat solely endemic to New Zealand. The larval stage and the imago produce a blue-green bioluminescence. The species is known to dwell in caves and on sheltered banks in the native bush where humidity is high, as moisture helps to maintain their silk structures that capture prey. Its Māori names are pūrātoke, from the verb "to glow", and titiwai, meaning "lights reflected in water." This likely derives from the glowworms' presence near bodies of water, where their luminous displays are reflected.

== Distribution and Discovery ==
Arachnocampa luminosa is widespread across both the North and the South Island of New Zealand, although populations generally occur in cave systems and in native bush where prey species are available and humidity is high. They shelter in caves or crevices that provide suitable darkness and protect their silk snares from air currents, near bodies of thick mud or still water where their insectine prey can breed.

Some sites have become popular destinations for tourists wanting to see the glowworms. These include the caves in Waitomo, Waipu, Inglewood and Te Ana-au, and also in areas of native vegetation such as the Wellington Botanical Gardens. The temperature and humidity levels inside the Waitomo caves are atypical in contrast to the other caves in temperate latitudes. When comparing climatic data from 1977 to 1980 and 1955, it is shown that the Waitomo caves were more stable in 1955 compared to present time. This increase in climatic variability is thought to be because in 1975, the entrance was unblocked, forcing the cave to behave as a wind tunnel.

The first written record of the species dates from 1871 when it was collected from a gold mine in New Zealand's Thames region. At first it was thought to be related to the European glowworm beetle (Lampyris noctiluca), but in 1886, a Christchurch teacher proved that it was the larva of a gnat, not a beetle. The species was first formally described in 1891 with the species name Bolitophila luminosa and was assigned to the family Mycetophilidae. In 1924, it was placed within a new genus of its own, Arachnocampa, because the wing venation of the adults and the behaviour of the larvae differed significantly from other Bolitophila fly species.

== Life cycle ==
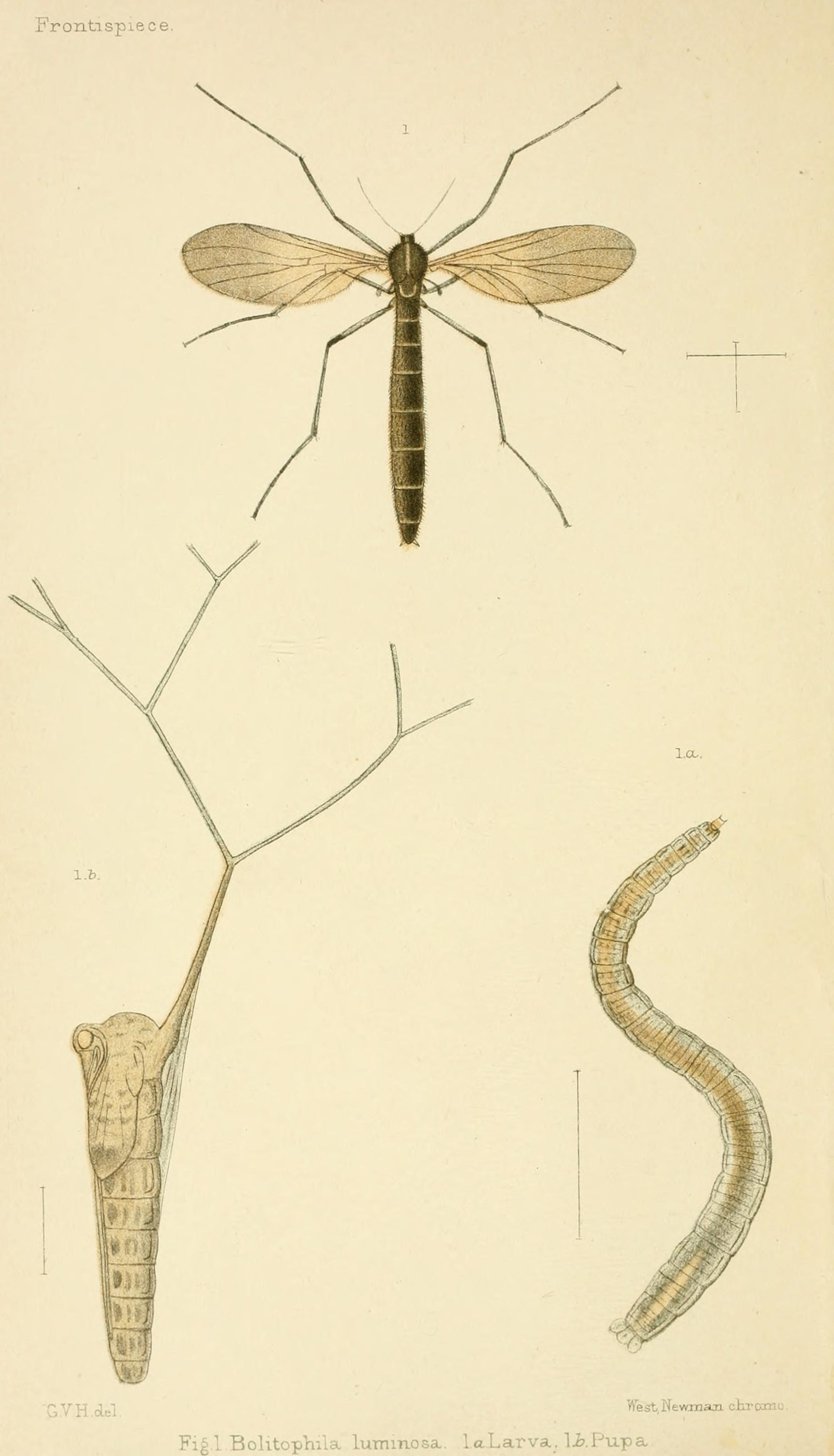
Adult, larval and pupal life stages

The spherical eggs (0.75mm in diameter) are usually deposited directly onto the cave wall. Upon hatching, the cylindrical larva immediately begins to glow. When they first emerge they are usually between 3 and 5 millimeters long, and will grow to between 30 and 40mm across several months. The larva may move around on the surface of the cave or bank before selecting a site to begin producing its silk nest. Most larvae emerge during the spring, and the behaviour observed of both the pupae and adult New Zealand glowworms has shown that the longest stage that the Arachnocampa goes through is the larval stage which can last up to a full year.

The larva spins a nest out of silk on the ceiling of the cave and then hangs down up to 30 silk threads along which it regularly places small sticky droplets. Their prey largely include other small Diptera (especially midges) although glowworms living on banks may also trap spiders and other non-flying invertebrates.

After five larval instars, the larva will suspend itself on a long thread and pupates over up to 24 hours. The pupal phase lasts about two weeks. During this time, the pupa continue to glow, although males eventually lose their glow. The adults which eventually emerge are poor fliers and usually emerge during the winter, generally living for up to 76 hours in the case of females and up to 96 hours in the case of males. Females usually lay over 100 eggs and they usually hatch after about 20 days.

== Behaviour ==
=== Bioluminescence ===
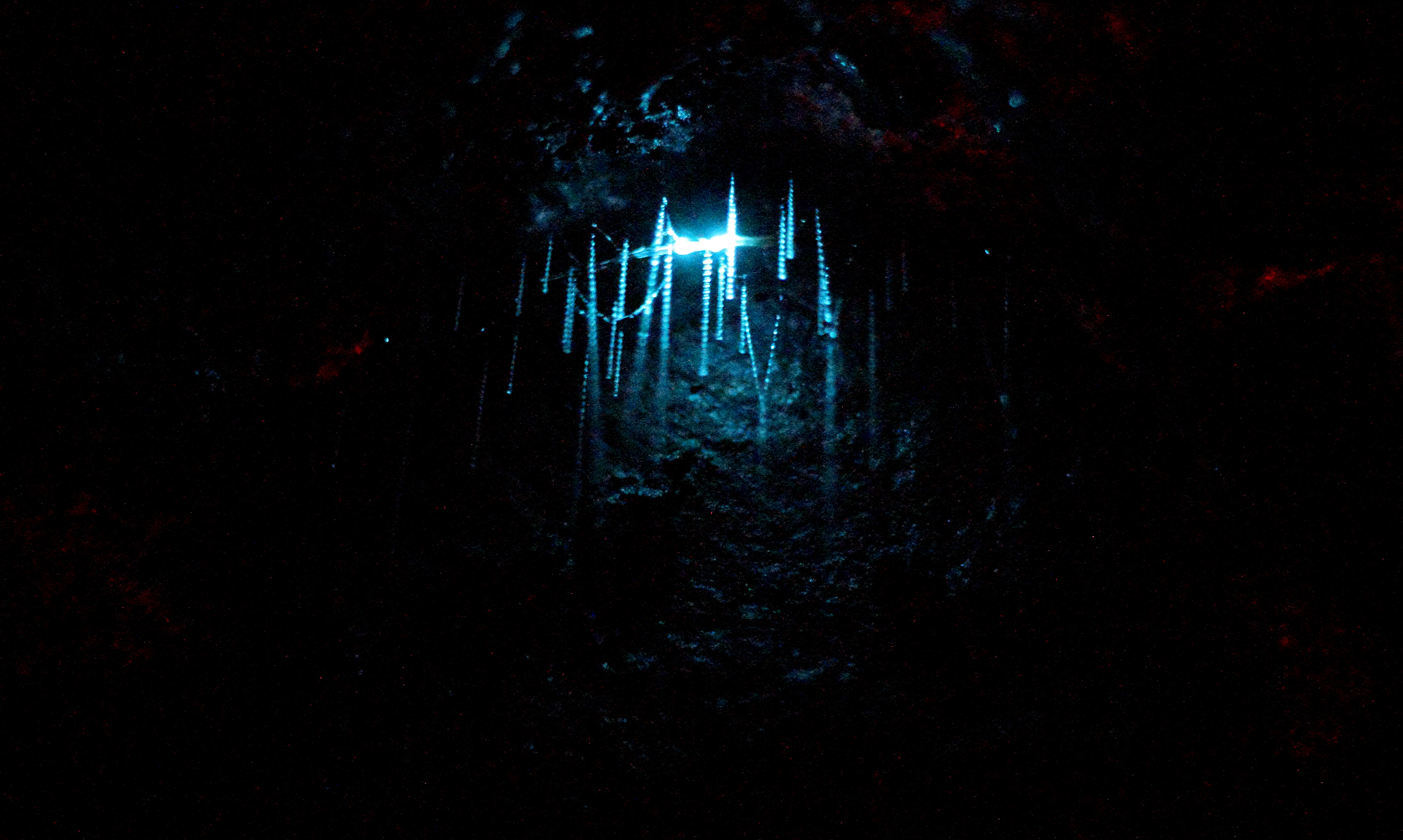
A larval glowworm in its nest with bioluminescent glow.

The blue-green glow that the larvae of Arachnocampa luminosa demonstrate, reaches a maximum wavelength of 487 nm and is produced through a biochemical reaction involving a distinct luciferase enzyme and a specific luciferin molecule. Notably, the luciferase enzyme in glowworms differs from that found in fireflies, despite some similarities. The unique luciferin used by glowworms is synthesised from xanthurenic acid and the amino acid ‘tyrosine’, setting it apart from other known bioluminescent systems, including those of fireflies, which typically utilise D-luciferin.

The bioluminescent systems of glowworms and fireflies have distinct evolutionary origins. Glowworms belong to the order Diptera, specifically the family Keroplatidae, while fireflies are beetles classified within the order Coleoptera and the superfamily Elateroidea. These two orders diverged approximately 330 million years ago during the Carboniferous period, and there are no known intervening bioluminescent species between them.

While this species has the capability to glow at all stages of its life cycle excluding as an egg, the larvae of Arachnocampa luminosa exhibit the largest bioluminescence, primarily to fulfil the role of attracting prey. The ability to produce bioluminescence in the terminal cells of the Malpighian tubules is crucial for their predatory lifestyle. The bright glow acts as bait for prey and attracts them into the silk fishing lines constructed by the larvae. The pupae and adults of this species also produce light although the purpose is not clear. One suggestion has been that the light allows adult males to find potential mates. However, there is little evidence to support this. It is possible that the bioluminescence in adults is simply a carry-over from the larval form because the Malpighian tubules are unaffected during metamorphosis.

Larvae can detect each other's glows and adjust their light output to synchronise with neighbouring individuals, a phenomenon supported by experiments involving timed exposure to LED lights in controlled environments. The glowing behaviour of the larvae plays a heavy role in their social dynamics, as this coordination results in a more intense collective display, increasing the effectiveness of their predatory traps. Synchronised diurnal cycles of bioluminescence differ markedly from the on-off cycles observed in glowworms exposed to daylight; captured using time lapses. This synchronisation is crucial, as it may enhance their ability to attract prey when flying insects are most active. The timing of their glow is therefore linked to the presence of potential food sources, suggesting that these bioluminescent patterns have evolved to optimise feeding opportunities.

=== Feeding ===
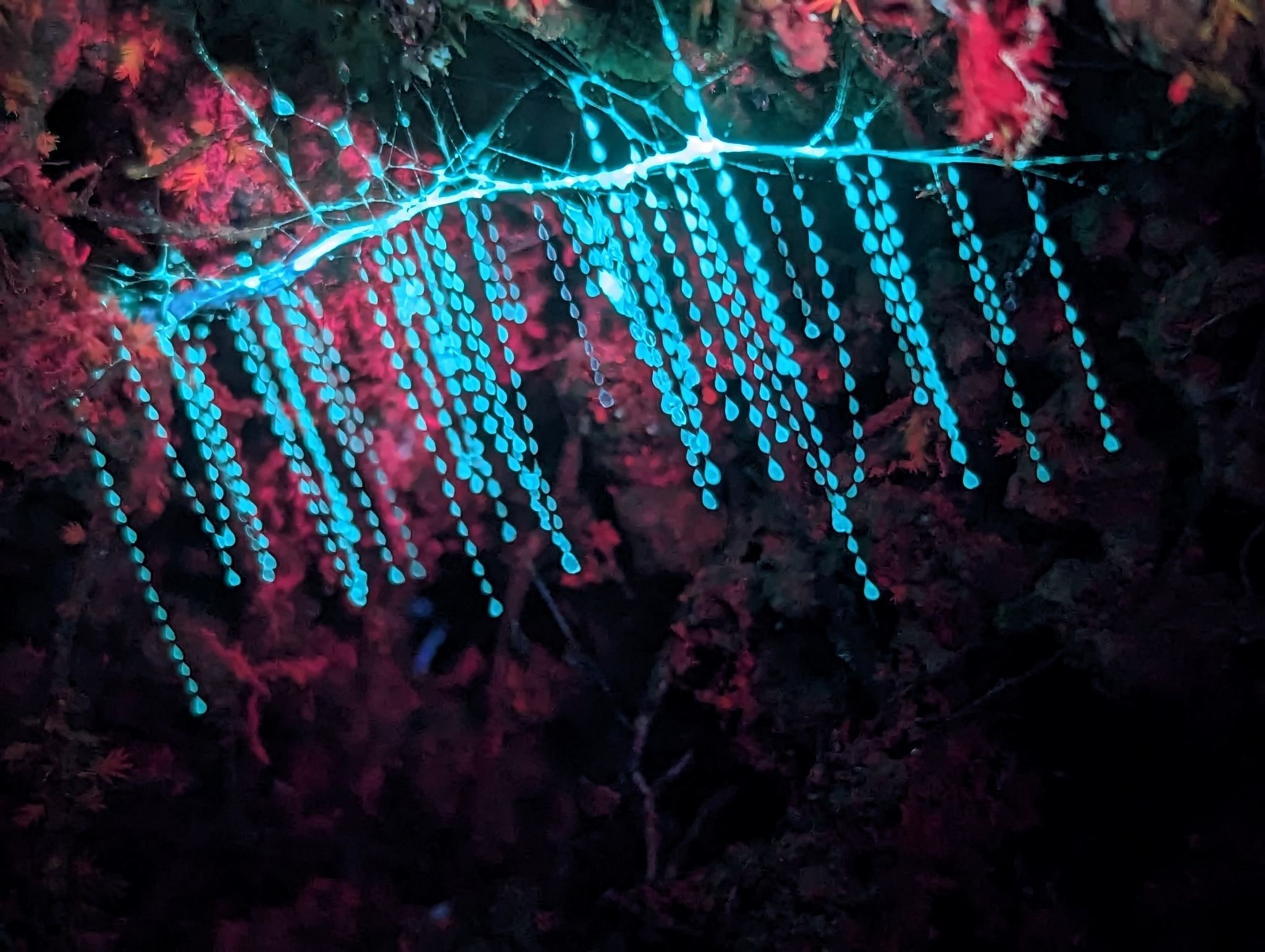
Threads under UV light.

Fungus gnats usually feed on fungi such as mushrooms. However, a small group including Arachnocampa luminosa are carnivorous. Using their dark, damp and cool environment to their advantage, glowworms construct vertical silk threads coated with mucus to trap flying insects. Alongside this, they use their bluish-green glow to attract the small flying insects and lure the prey into the snares of their sticky threads. When the prey is entangled in a snare, the larva pulls it up by ingesting its own snare and begins to feed on the prey alive after immoblising them. Along with flying prey, non-flying prey are also very important for the glowworms diet, as it is common for spiders that reside in the caves to build their webs in front of the glow-worms snare, shielding it from flying insects (A12). The bright glow of the larvae also attracts these crawling insects towards the snares as well as the flying insects.

=== Predators and Parasites ===
Arachnocampa luminosa have a few natural predators; the most notable being the cave harvestmen (including the short-legged harvestmen, Hendea myersi cavernicola, and the long-legged harvestmen, Megalopsalis tumida). Recordings of the harvestmen's predation in Waitomo caves observed successful captures of separate adult glowworm within just 133 seconds after pair separation.

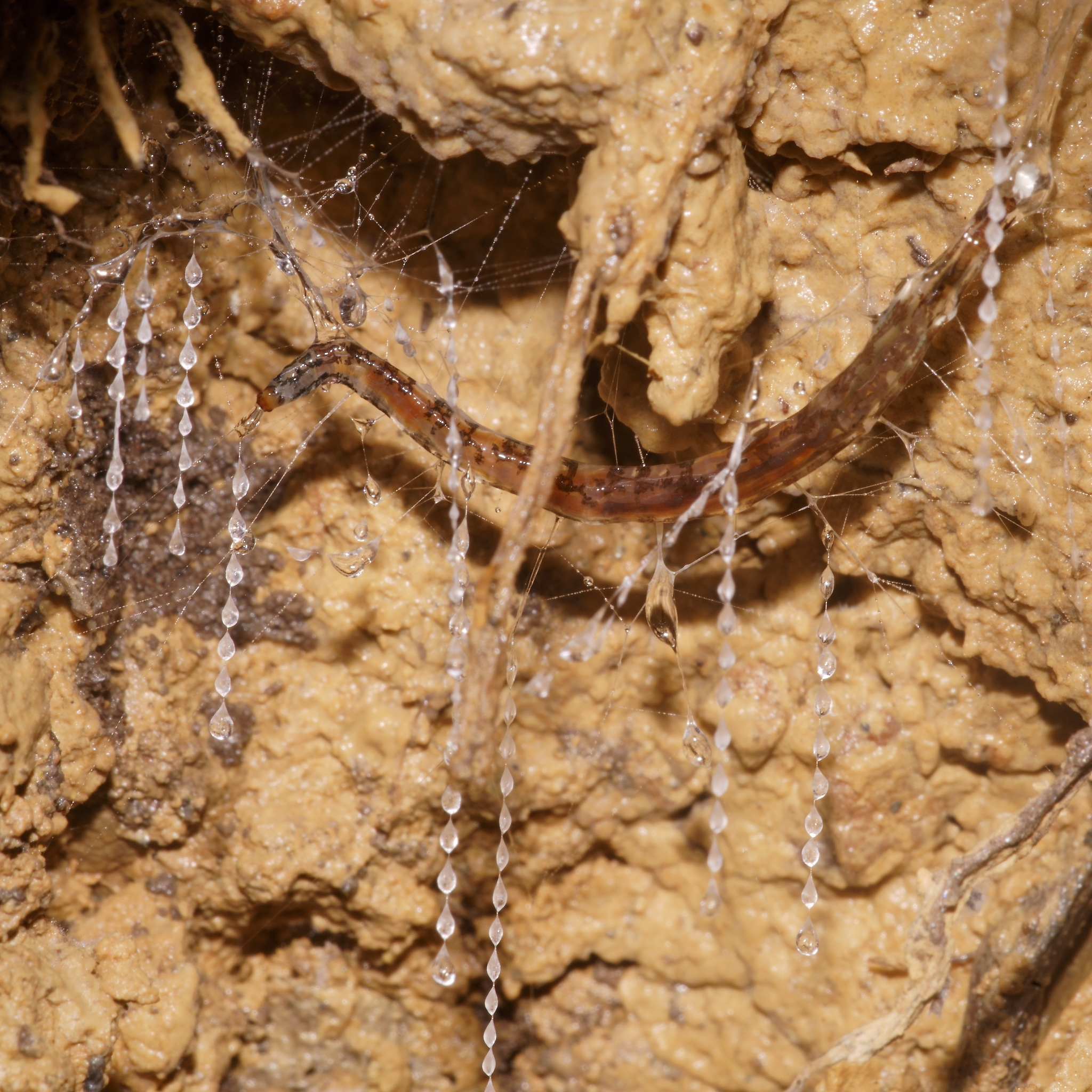
Larva

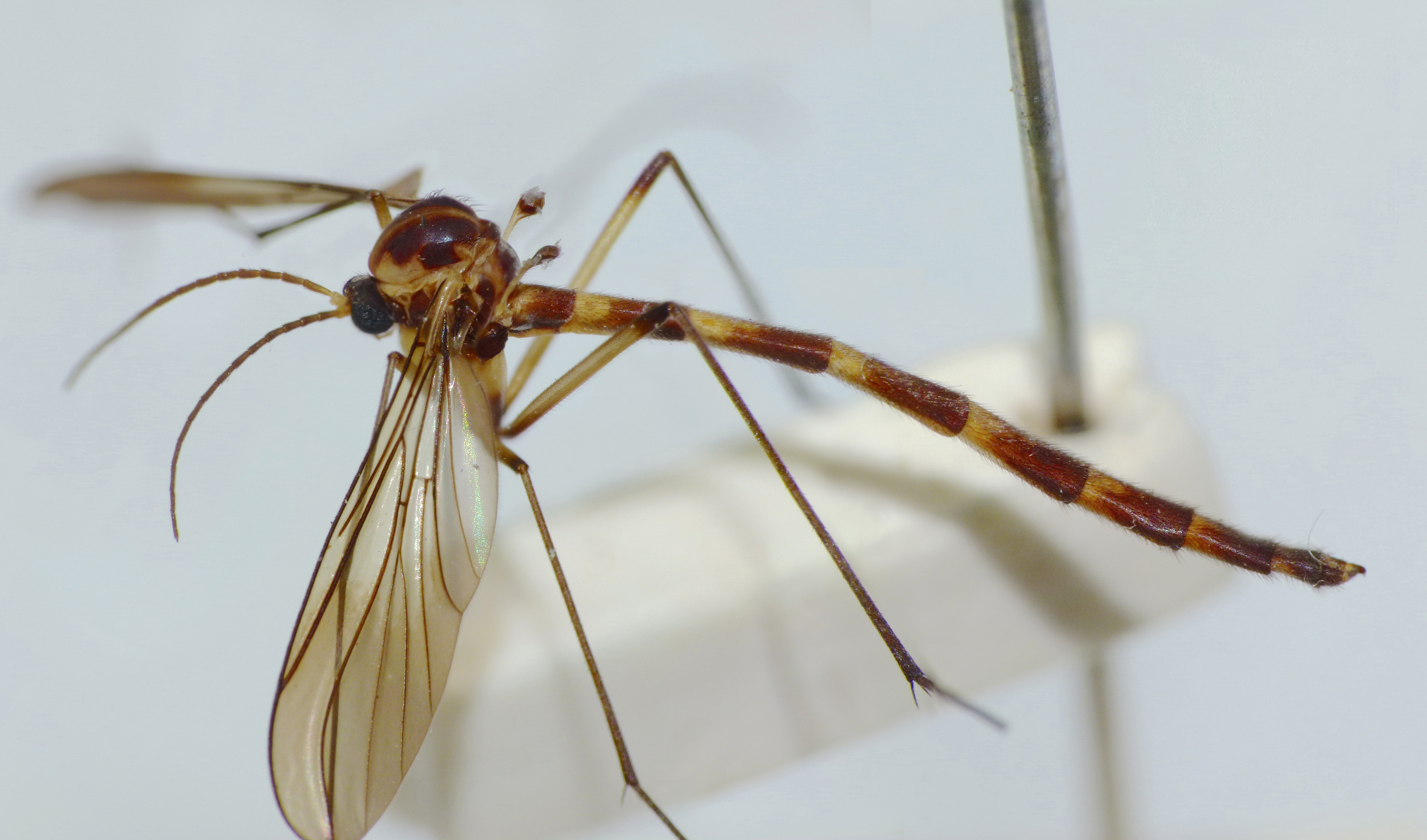
Adult

Another cause of mortality is a result of a white fungal pathogen identified as Tolypocladium sp. (Moniliales). This pale-looking fungus preys on the glow-worm pupae, with statistics suggesting that approximately 40% of pupae found in caves can fall victim to it. Preliminary experiments show indication that an increase in temperature of glowworm inhabited caves are a direct cause for the prevalence of the fungus, in contrast to non-tourist caves in the Waitomo district.

During dry periods, which are becoming more common as a result of global climate change, the larvae lower themselves from the walls of Waitomo Caves to search for food, and winter floods tend to wash away and kill them as a result. There are claims from tour guides that the larvae can survive for as long as 11 hours when submerged in water, however this is yet to be confirmed.

In environments where glow-worms are densely populated, cannibalism can also occur, as they may consume one another when resources are scarce. The pupae can last as a food source for the larva for many days. Additionally, many adult glowworms get ensnared in the larval silk threads which are primarily designed for capturing prey.

== Conservation status ==
The total population of glowworms (Arachnocampa luminosa) in New Zealand is currently unknown; however, they are not considered endangered, and their population has not shown signs of decline over recent years. That being said, with the ongoing pressures of the recent climate crisis, many glow worm sites such as Te Ananui Cave are being managed by local conservation groups to preserve these spots for future generations. Guidelines are also often implemented in these areas by tour companies to help further preserve and respect these ecosystems.
