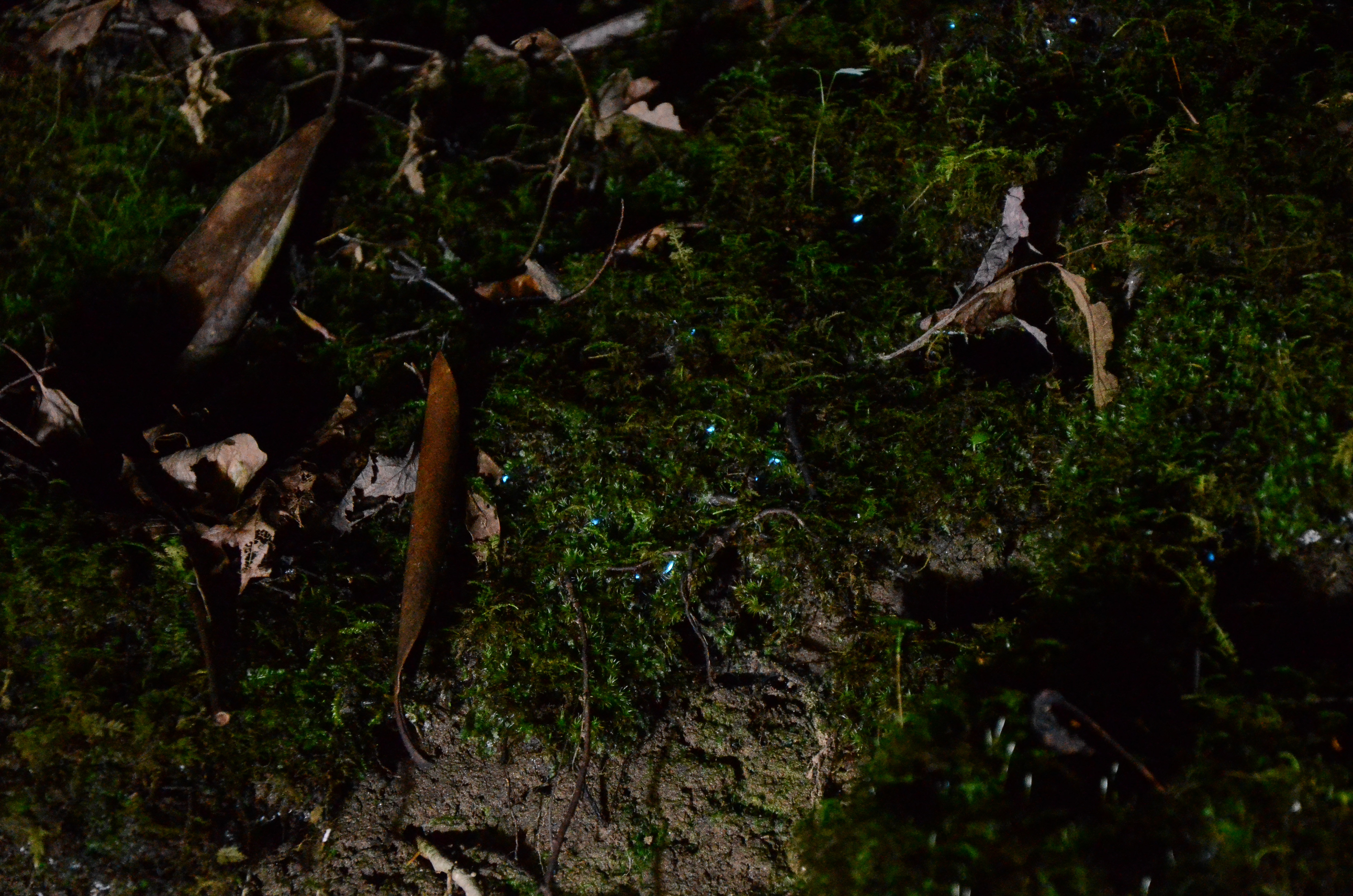
- O. fultoni larvae at Anna Ruby Falls/Judy Toppins, USDA Forest Service

Scientific classification
- Kingdom: Animalia
- Phylum: Arthropoda
- Clade: Pancrustacea
- Class: Insecta
- Order: Diptera
- Family: Keroplatidae
- Genus: Orfelia
- Species: O. fultoni

Binomial name
- Orfelia fultoni (Fisher, 1940)

= Orfelia fultoni =

Species of fly

Orfelia fultoni or “dismalites” is a species of gnat, which are part of the fly order or Diptera, native to certain states of the US It is the only bioluminescent species of fly found in North America. The carnivorous larvae, sometimes referred to as a "glowworm", produce the bluest light of any studied bioluminescent insect.

== Discovery ==
O. fultoni was discovered in the early 1940s near a spring in Glenville, North Carolina by B. B. Fulton, who was performing field work when he noticed O. fultoni's glowing blue light at night. He found the larvae concealed themselves in crevices during the day and crawled out at night on their webs to emit their light and feed. The larvae had many similar characteristics as spiders including the use of their webs. Fulton was unable to identify the species, so he attempted to raise some of the larvae to maturity but was unsuccessful in his first attempt when his field work was discontinued and the larvae samples were exposed to heat and died. In a second attempt a year later, he found the larvae thrived when kept in a cool, moist environment. Once raised to maturity, entomologist Elizabeth Gault Fisher classified them as an undescribed species of Platyura.

== Habitat ==
Orfelia fultoni occurs in the Appalachian Mountains and Cumberland Plateau, primarily in the states of Alabama, Georgia, North Carolina, Tennessee, and Virginia. The larvae of the species live in stream banks among moss and rock cavities, as well as in wet sandstone caves. They build sticky webs on moss, rotten wood, in cracks between rocks or on bare soil, and using their two bioluminescent lanterns as an attractant, capture flying prey in their webs. Once caught in the web, chemicals in the web paralyze the prey. O. fultoni require a dark, still area where their lights can shine and where the wind doesn’t disturb their webs too much.

=== Dismals Canyon ===
Orfelia fultoni has sometimes been referred to by the common name "dismalites", in consequence of their presence in Dismals Canyon, an 86 acres (35 hectares) National Natural Landmark with a spring-fed creek and waterfall in northwest Alabama. The canyon is home to the largest population of O. fultoni anywhere in the United States. There are two peak seasons for the larvae in Alabama, the spring peak of late April through May, and the fall peak at the end of September through the first of October. They are visible throughout the year in smaller numbers. Dismals Canyon offers guided evening tours for visitors to see the dismalites.

== Biology ==
Orfelia fultoni larvae are brownish, measuring on average 10–20 mm (0.39–0.79 in) long and 1–2 mm (0.039–0.079 in) in diameter. It is distantly related to Arachnocampa, a genus of gnats endemic to New Zealand and Australia with a bioluminescent larval stage. O. fultoni, however, has a morphologically and biochemically distinct bioluminescent system from Arachnocampa, which evolved these features independently (known as convergent evolution). They use bilateral, anterior, and posterior lanterns to emit their light as opposed to Arachnocampa which uses a single caudal lantern.

O. fultoni has four stages in its life cycle. The first stage is the egg, which are sticky brown balls which hang onto walls, overhangs and cave ceilings. These hatch into the larvae after approximately 7–9 days. The larvae stage is the most recognizable since it is at this stage O. fultoni emits its bioluminescent glow; this stage usually lasts 6–9 months, depending on the availability of food. However, the glow worm can survive for long periods without eating. The larva is the only stage at which O. fultoni feeds, where it eats primarily midges, mayflies, and caddisflies as well as the occasional adult of its species. The third stage is the pupa: the larvae uses its sticky threads to create a protective barrier, then hangs in the middle of the barrier and encases itself in a pupal "skin". After approximately two weeks, it emerges as the adult gnat. The adult males will search for a female pupa to attend, and after mating with the emergent female, it dies. The adult female will lay upwards of 130 eggs shortly after mating and then die.
