= Orfelia =

Scientific classification
- Kingdom: Animalia
- Phylum: Arthropoda
- Clade: Pancrustacea
- Class: Insecta
- Order: Diptera
- Family: Keroplatidae
- Subfamily: Keroplatinae
- Tribe: Orfeliini
- Genus: Orfelia; Costa 1857

Type species
- Platyura fasciata Meigen, 1904

Synonyms
- Zelmira Meigen, 1900

Genus of flies

Orfelia is a cosmopolitan genus of flies in the family Keroplatidae.

== Species ==
- Orfelia affinis (Brunetti, 1912)
- Orfelia amurensis Zaitzev, 1994
- Orfelia angulata (Sasakawa, 1994)
- Orfelia angustata (Van Duzee, 1928)
- Orfelia apicipennis (Brunetti, 1912)
- Orfelia baishanzuensis Cao & Xu, 2008
- Orfelia bezzii (Winnertz, 1863)
- Orfelia bicolor Lane, 1961
- Orfelia boreoalpina Salmela, 2017
- Orfelia colei Evenhuis, 2006
- Orfelia discoloria (Meigen, 1818)
- Orfelia divaricata (Loew, 1870)
- Orfelia equalis (Van Duzee, 1928)
- Orfelia excelsa Chandler, 1994
- Orfelia falcata Zaitzev, 1994
- Orfelia fasciata (Meigen, 1804)
- Orfelia fascipennis (Say, 1824)
- Orfelia flaviventris (Brunetti, 1912)
- Orfelia fultoni (Fisher, 1940)
- Orfelia funerea (Brunetti, 1912)
- Orfelia georgica Kurina & Jürgenstein, 2013
- Orfelia gruevi Bechev, 2002
- Orfelia helvola Cao & Xu, 2008
- Orfelia krivosheinae Zaitzev, 1994
- Orfelia limbata Zaitzev, 1994
- Orfelia matilei Zaitzev, 1994
- Orfelia minima (Giglio-Tos, 1890)
- Orfelia mitchellensis (Shaw, 1941)
- Orfelia negotiosa Sivec & Plassmann, 1982
- Orfelia nemoralis (Meigen, 1818)
- Orfelia nigribarba (Van Duzee, 1928)
- Orfelia nigricornis (Fabricius, 1805)
- Orfelia notabilis (Williston, 1893)
- Orfelia ochracea (Meigen, 1818)
- Orfelia pallida (Staeger, 1840)
- Orfelia persimilis Caspers, 1991
- Orfelia rossica Evenhuis, 2006
- Orfelia sachalinensis Evenhuis, 2006
- Orfelia saeva Sivec & Plassmann, 1982
- Orfelia sagax (Johannsen, 1910)
- Orfelia subdiscoloria (Matile, 1969)
- Orfelia subnigricornis Zaitzev & Menzel, 1996
- Orfelia trifida Kurina & Jürgenstein, 2013
- Orfelia tristis (Lundström, 1911)
- Orfelia ussuriensis Zaitzev & Menzel, 1996
