= Keroplatus =

Scientific classification
- Domain: Eukaryota
- Kingdom: Animalia
- Phylum: Arthropoda
- Class: Insecta
- Order: Diptera
- Family: Keroplatidae
- Subfamily: Keroplatinae
- Genus: Keroplatus; Bosc, 1792

Species
- See text

Genus of gnats

Keroplatus is a genus of predatory fungus gnats in the family Keroplatidae. Several species are known to be bioluminescent.

== Selected Species ==
Some species within this genus include:

- K. apicalis (Adams, 1903)
- K. biformis (Okada, 1938)
- K. carbonarius (Bosc, 1803)
- K. clausus (Coquillett, 1901)
- K. militaris (Johannsen, 1910)
- K. nipponicus (Okada, 1938)
- K. reaumurii (Dufour, 1839)
- K. samiri (Khalaf, 1971)
- K. terminalis (Coquillett, 1905)
- K. testaceus (Dalman, 1818)
- K. tipuloides (Bosc, 1792)
