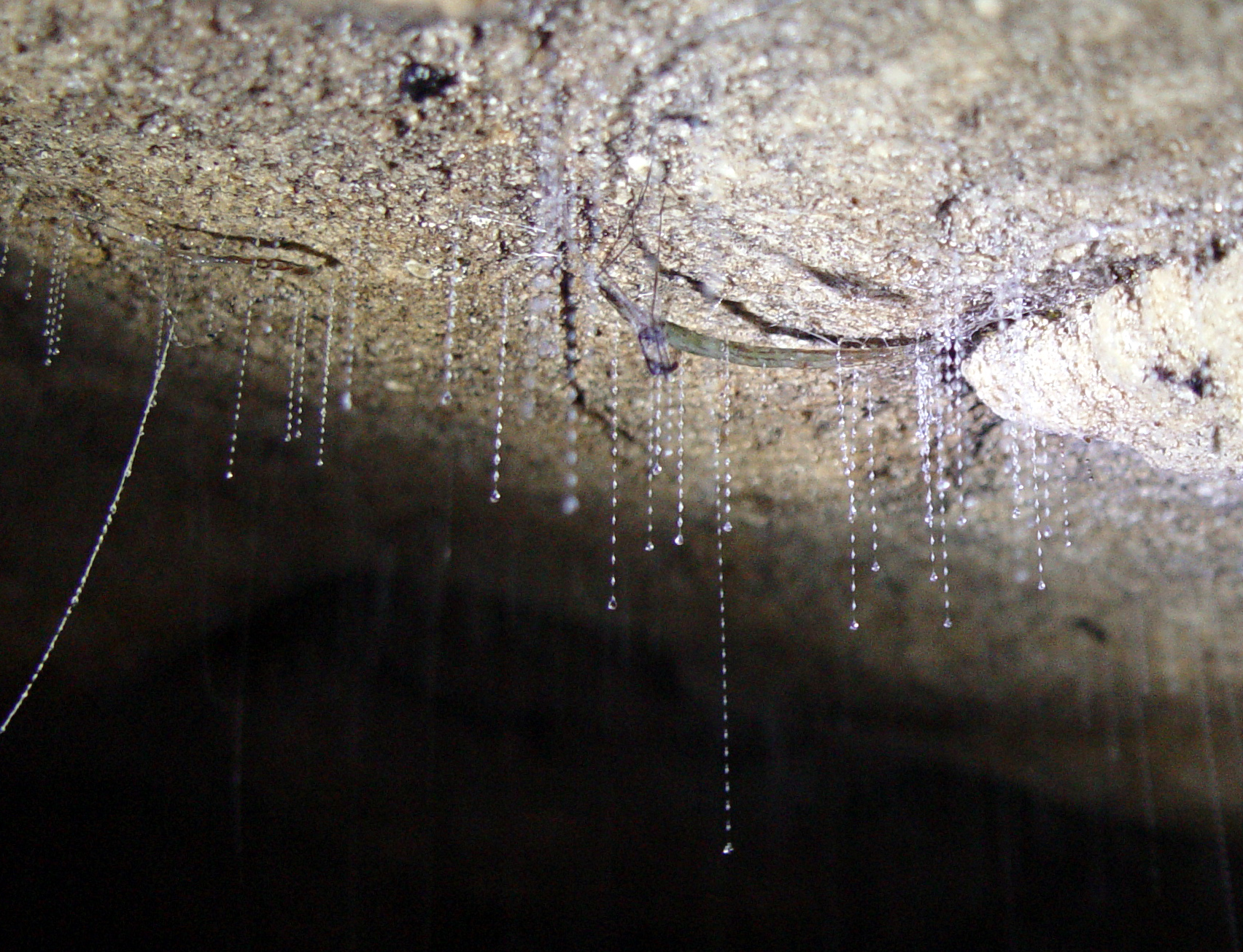
- Two A. luminosa larvae with their prey snares

Scientific classification
- Kingdom: Animalia
- Phylum: Arthropoda
- Clade: Pancrustacea
- Class: Insecta
- Order: Diptera
- Family: Keroplatidae
- Genus: Arachnocampa; Edwards, 1924

Type species
- Bolitophila luminosa Skuse, 1891

Species
- Various - see text

Synonyms
- Lucifera Baker, 2010; Campara Harrison, 1966

= Arachnocampa =

Genus of flies

Arachnocampa is a genus of nine fungus gnat species which have a bioluminescent larval stage, akin to the larval stage of glowworm beetles. The species of Arachnocampa are endemic to Australia and New Zealand, dwelling in caves and grottos, or sheltered places in forests.

A previous placement was in the genus Bolitophila. This species and several related species were moved in 1924 to a new genus, Arachnocampa, meaning "spider web-worm," for the way the larvae hang sticky silk threads to ensnare prey. The genus Arachnocampa belongs in the family Keroplatidae.

== Common features ==
Arachnocampa species have holometabolous metamorphosis with eggs, larvae, pupae, and adults. Individuals spend most of their lives as larvae.

These flies live from about 6 through 12 months as larvae, depending on food availability. A larva is only about 3–5 mm long when it emerges from its egg, and can grow up to about 3 cm long.

The larva spins a nest out of silk on the ceiling of the cave and then hangs down as many as 70 threads of silk (called snares) from around the nest, each up to 30 or 40 cm long and holding droplets of mucus. The larvae can only live in a place out of the wind, to stop their lines being tangled, hence caves, overhangs or deep rainforest. In some species, the droplets of mucus on the silk threads are poisonous, enhancing the trap's ability to subdue prey quickly.

A larva's glow attracts prey into its threads. The roof of a cave covered with larva can look remarkably like a blue starry sky at night. The pupae also glow, and this glow may also help males to locate females before they emerge from the pupa. Prey include midges, mayflies, caddisflies, mosquitos, moths, and even small snails or millipedes. When a prey animal is caught by a snare, its larva pulls it up (at up to about 2 mm a second) and feeds on the prey. When Arachnocampa prey are scarce, larvae may show cannibalism, eating other larvae, pupae or adult flies.

The glow is the result of a chemical reaction that involves luciferin, the substrate; luciferase, the enzyme that acts upon luciferin; adenosine triphosphate, the energy molecule; and oxygen. It occurs in modified excretory organs known as Malpighian tubules in the abdomen. Unlike other insects, Arachnocampa tubules have light producing cells at the tips, which function independently of the waste excretion cells.

The body of the larva is soft while the head capsule is hard. When it outgrows the head capsule it moults, shedding its skin. This happens four times throughout its life.

At the end of the larva stage, it becomes a pupa, hanging down from the roof of the cave. The pupal stage lasts about 1 or 2 weeks and it glows intermittently. The male stops glowing a few days before emerging, the female's glow increases. The glow from the female is believed to be to attract a mate, and males may be waiting there when she emerges.

The adults of both sexes cannot feed and live only a short time. They glow, but only intermittently. Their sole purpose is to mate, and for the female to lay eggs. Adults are poor fliers and so will often remain in the same area, building a colony of glowworms. The female lays a total of about 130 eggs, in clumps of 40 or 50, and dies soon after laying.The eggs hatch after about 20 days and the cycle repeats.

The larvae are sensitive to light and disturbance and will retreat into their nests and stop glowing if they or their snares are touched. Generally they have few predators. Their greatest danger is from human interference.

== Species ==
- Arachnocampa buffaloensis Baker, 2010 is found in an alpine cave on Mount Buffalo in Victoria. Its presence suggests rainforest may have extended up the mountain in the past. This species is listed as a threatened species in Victoria (listed as Arachnocampa sp. "Mount Buffalo glow-worm").
- Arachnocampa flava Harrison, 1966 is found in Queensland. The Natural Bridge in the Gold Coast hinterland is one well-known habitat.
- Arachnocampa gippslandensis Baker, 2010 - eastern Victoria
- Arachnocampa girraweenensis Baker, 2010 - southeast Queensland and northern New South Wales
- Arachnocampa luminosa (Skuse, 1891) is found in New Zealand, in both the North and South islands.
- Arachnocampa otwayensis Baker, 2010 - western Victoria
- Arachnocampa richardsae Harrison, 1966 is found in New South Wales. The Newnes glow worm tunnel in the Blue Mountains is one well-known habitat.
- Arachnocampa tasmaniensis Ferguson, 1925 is found in Tasmania (as the name suggests). One habitat is the Marakoopa Cave, Mole Creek near Cradle Mountain.
- Arachnocampa tropica Baker, 2010 - north Queensland

== See also ==
- Orfelia fultoni - a North American relative that has similar habits.
