= Elizabeth Gault Fisher =

U.S. entomologist, bacteriologist and amateur bryologist (1909–2000)

- Born: April 29, 1909; Baltimore, Maryland, U.S.
- Died: January 1, 2000; Westminster, Maryland, U.S.
- Resting place: Green Mount Cemetery
- Education: Cornell University (BS, PhD)
- Occupations: Entomologist, bacteriologist, bryologist, botanical collector

Academic background
- Thesis: A Comparative Study of the Male Terminalia of the Mycetophilidae of Nearctic America

Elizabeth Gault Fisher (April 29, 1909 – January 1, 2000) was an American entomologist, bacteriologist, and bryologist. She collected thousands of examples of Maryland mosses, including the first examples of a number of species in Maryland. A moss, Desmatodon fisherae, and an insect, Mycetophila fisherae, were named for her.

== Early life ==
Elizabeth Gault Fisher was born on April 29, 1909, in Baltimore, Maryland. She was the daughter of Anne (née Baylor) and Dr. William A. Fisher, health commissioner of Baltimore. She attended the Calvert School, St. Timothy's School, graduating in 1927, and Roland Park Country School, graduating in 1930. She studied at Cornell University beginning in 1930, and graduating with a Bachelor of Science in 1934, a master's degree and a Ph.D. in entomology in 1938. Her dissertation was A Comparative Study of the Male Terminalia of the Mycetophilidae of Nearctic America.

== Career ==
In 1939, Fisher went to Philadelphia to research moss. Fisher became a Research Associate in the Department of Insects at the Philadelphia Academy of Natural Sciences. As an entomologist, her specialty was glowworm flies and wrote papers describing numerous insect species, including the Appalachian glowworm fly (Orfelia fultoni). In 1942, she joined the Harriet Lane Clinic at Johns Hopkins Hospital as a biomedical research analyst in bacteriology. After working for Johns Hopkins for three years, she left and bought a farm in Sykesville, Maryland, where she further pursued her interests in moss and entomology.

Fisher began collecting mosses and liverworts in the early 1950s and continued until the early 1980s, amassing over 3,500 samples. She was the first to collect a number of species in Maryland, including Polytrichum strictum, Gymnostomum aeruginosum, Brachythecium velutinum, Trematodon longicollis, Pohlia annotina, Ephemerum spinulosum, Funaria americana, and Pottia truncata. On forays with the Brooks Bird Club, she collected Desmatodon fisherae in Virginia in 1965 and Splachnum ampullaceum in West Virginia in 1968, extending the known southern range of the latter.

She was a member of the Sierra Club, Wilderness Society and Cylburn Society.

== Personal life ==
She also painted, hiked, and made pottery.

== Death ==
Elizabeth Gault Fisher died on January 1, 2000, at Carroll County General Hospital in Westminster, Maryland. She was buried at Green Mount Cemetery.
