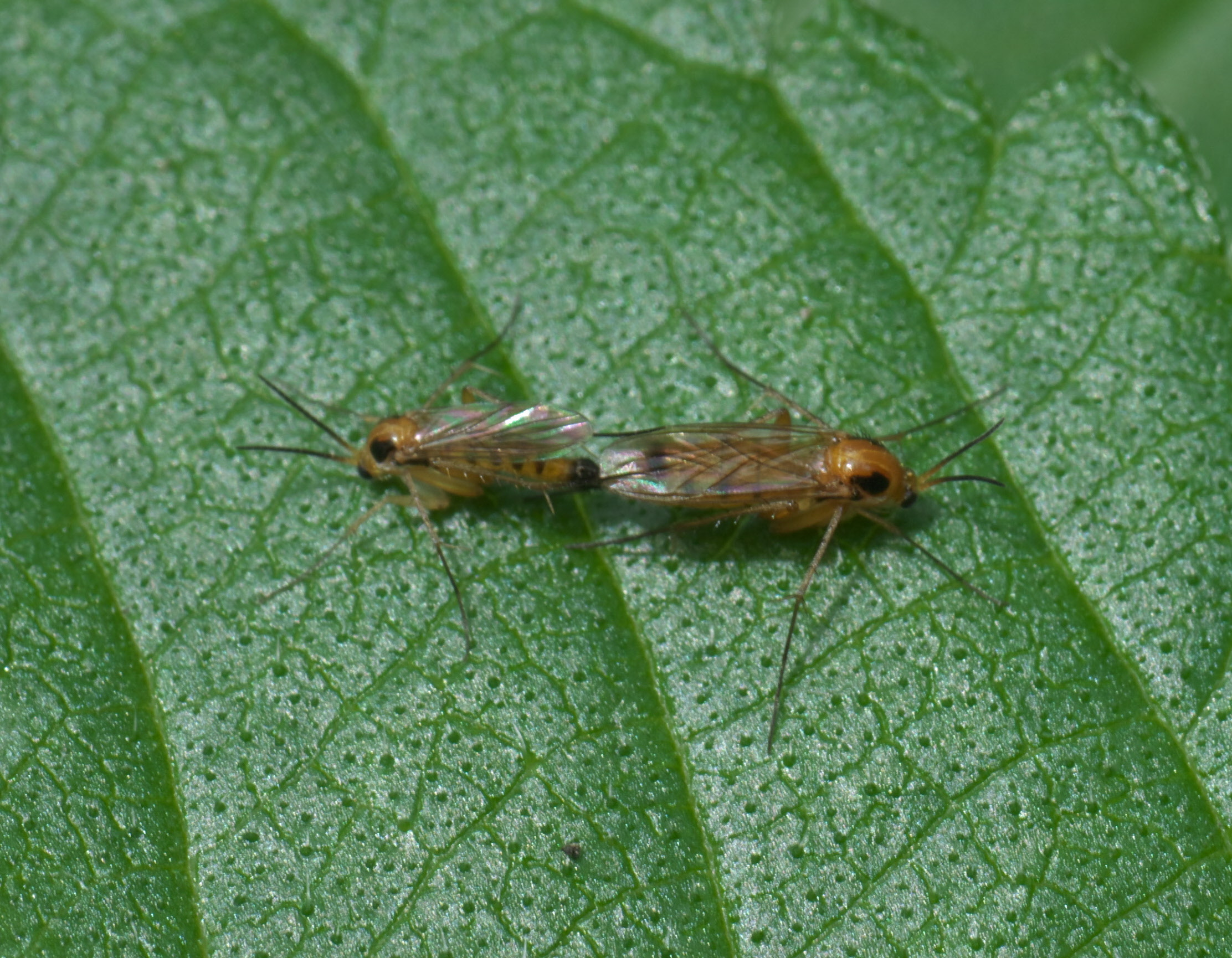

Scientific classification
- Kingdom: Animalia
- Phylum: Arthropoda
- Clade: Pancrustacea
- Class: Insecta
- Order: Diptera
- Family: Mycetophilidae
- Subfamily: Leiinae
- Genus: Leia; Meigen, 1818

Type species
- Leia fascipennis Meigen, 1818

Diversity
- 189 species

Synonyms
- Glaphyroptera Winnertz, 1863; Neoglaphyroptera Osten Sacken, 1878; Leiomyia Edwards 1913; Leja Gimmerthal 1832; Lejomya Rondani 1856; Lejosoma Rondani 1856

= Leia (fly) =

Genus of flies

Leia is a genus of fungus gnats in the family Mycetophilidae. There are 189 recognized species in Leia.

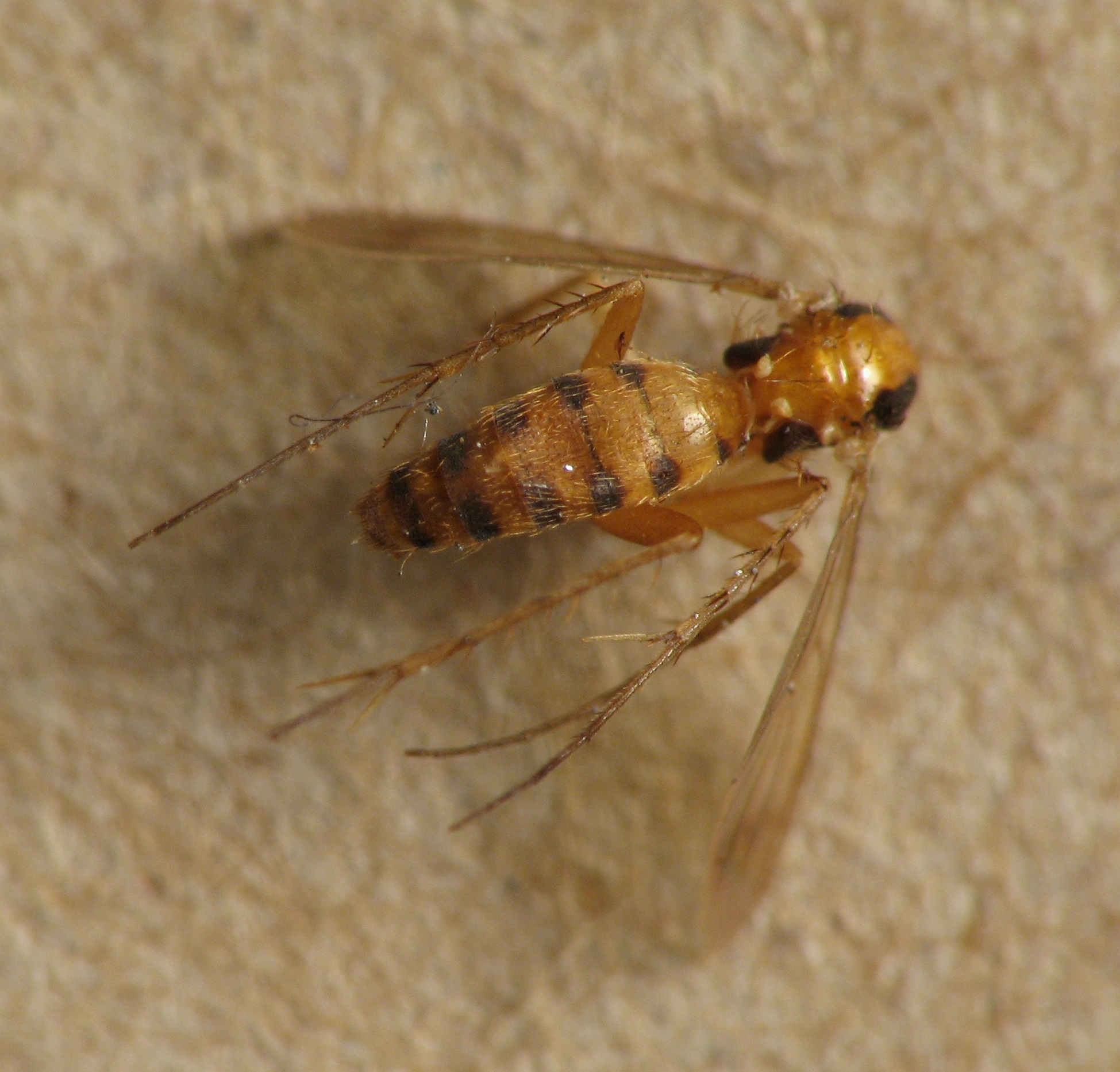
Leia bivittata, dorsal view

== See also ==
- List of Leia species
