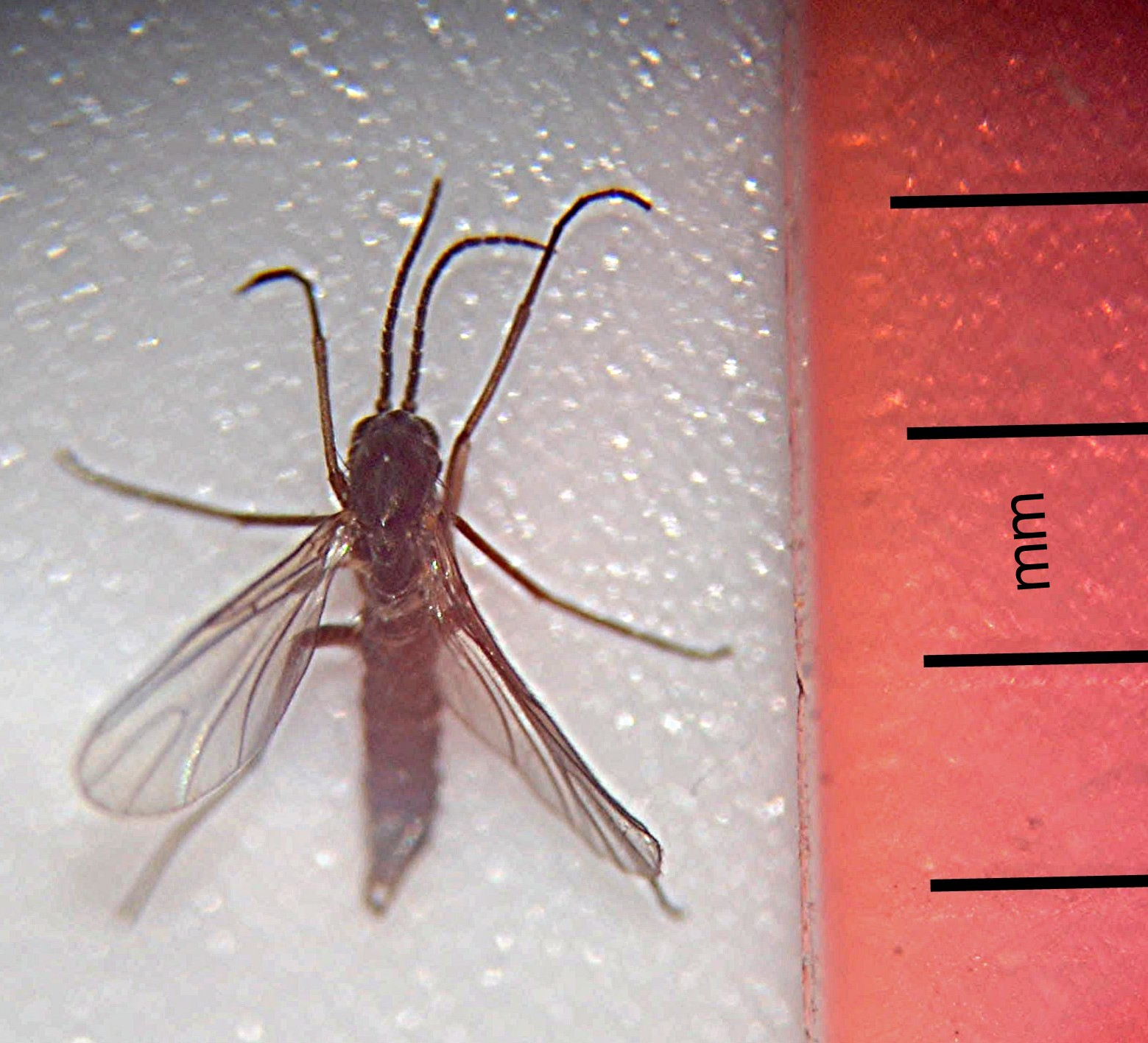
- Sciaridae spp.

Scientific classification
- Kingdom: Animalia
- Phylum: Arthropoda
- Clade: Pancrustacea
- Class: Insecta
- Order: Diptera
- Infraorder: Bibionomorpha
- Superfamily: Sciaroidea

Groups included
- Sciaridae Diadocidiidae Ditomyiidae Keroplatidae Bolitophilidae Mycetophilidae

Cladistically included but traditionally excluded taxa
- Mosquitoes (gall midges)

= Fungus gnat =

Fungus gnats

Group of insects

Fungus gnats are small, dark, short-lived gnats, of the families Sciaridae, Diadocidiidae, Ditomyiidae, Keroplatidae, Bolitophilidae, Mycetophilidae (order Diptera) and Rangomaramidae (long-winged fungus gnats); they constitute seven of the eight extant families placed in the superfamily Sciaroidea, which has 16 known families.

== Description ==
The larvae of most species feed on fungi growing on soil, helping in the decomposition of organic matter. However, some species are predatory, including those in the genus Arachnocampa – known as glowworms in Australia and New Zealand.

The adults are 2–8 millimetres (0.08–0.3 in) long, and are occasionally pollinators of plants and carriers of mushroom spores. They also may carry diseases such as pythium (which causes "damping-off" to kill seedlings) on their feet.

Most fungus gnats are weak fliers, and often walk over plants and soil, rather than flying. When airborne, the gnats may be annoying to humans by flying into their faces, eyes, and noses, both indoors and outdoors. These flies are sometimes confused with drain flies.

This species goes through 4 stages of life: egg, larva, pupa, and adult. The adults can live up to 10 days and lay up to 200-300 eggs at a time in the moist top layer of the soil. These eggs will typically hatch within 4 days and progress through the cycle. The pupa stage also consists of about 4 days, then adult gnats emerge and begin the whole process again.

== Hardiness ==
Some fungus gnats are exceptionally hardy, able to tolerate cold conditions through the use of antifreeze proteins. Typically, overwintering organisms can either avoid freezing or tolerate freezing, while Exechia nugatoria can do both. For E. nugatoria, the production of noncolligative antifreeze proteins (NAPs) protects the head and thorax from freezing, but do not protect the abdomen. Freezing of the head and thorax in other insects tends to have adverse effects on neural tissue. These protective mechanisms have been observed in certain species, but E. nugatoria is the only insect known to semi-freeze through the winter. By allowing the abdomen to freeze, evaporative water loss is reduced.

== Management ==
Fungus gnats in the family Sciaridae may be pests. They are typically harmless to healthy plants - and humans - but can inflict extensive damage to seedlings; their presence can indicate more serious problems. In houseplants, the presence of sciarids may indicate overwatering; they may be feeding on roots that have been immersed in water too long and are thus rotting, or the gnats may be attracted to fungus growing in saturated topsoil. Consequently, allowing the top two inches of soil to dry may reduce their numbers. The pests are sometimes also managed by placing a layer of sand pebbles, or indoor mulch on top of the soil around plants. Adding perlite or another similar soil conditioner can also help aerate the soil and improve drainage, both of which will reduce the growth of the fungi which the gnats feed upon.

=== Insecticides ===
Pyrethrins and the similar pyrethroid compounds are known to have insecticidal properties, including against fungus gnats. Related pyrethroid insectides have also been used. Pyrethrin compounds are known to occur in certain chrysanthemum flowers.

Commercial greenhouses typically employ the insect growth regulator diflubenzuron for control of fungus gnats and their larvae. It is applied to infected soil and will kill fungus gnat larvae for 30–60 days from a single application. Its mechanism of action is to interfere with chitin production and deposition and it also triggers insect larvae to molt early without a properly formed exoskeleton, resulting in the death of the larvae. Although it is targeted at fungus gnat larvae, care should be taken in applying it as it is highly toxic to aquatic invertebrates. Diflubenzuron typically has no toxic effect on adults; only the larvae are affected.

=== Biological control ===
Various methods of controlling or eliminating fungus gnats with biological pest control have been developed. For example, Bacillus thuringiensis israelensis (BTI) is known to produce proteins that can kill fungus gnats larvae and some other insects like mosquitos. BTI is a naturally occurring bacteria that has been used for decades—the United States EPA reports that it has no toxicity to humans. Several dozen products containing BTI have been approved for residential, commercial, and agricultural use in the United States. The israelensis subspecies is suggested because other types of Bacillus thuringiensis (BT), such as those for controlling caterpillars, are ineffective at controlling fungus gnats.

Steinernema nematodes have been used to control fungus gnats, including in combination with BTI. These nematodes, including the feltiae species, are parasites that can attack the larvae stage of fungus gnats.

Mites of the species Stratiolaelaps scimitus (formerly known as "Hypoaspis miles") have also been shown to be effective at controlling fungus gnats. These scimitus mites are a natural predator that eat fungus gnat eggs and small larvae.

=== Soaps, fly traps, and other methods ===
Other methods for controlling fungus gnats include drenching the soil annually in an insecticidal soap. Hydrogen peroxide can be mixed with water and used to kill fungus gnat larvae in infected soil with a mixture of one part 3% hydrogen peroxide mixed with four parts water, then applied to the soil. Adults can be trapped with sticky traps made of yellow card stock or heavy paper coated in an adhesive since the adults are attracted to the color yellow.

Since the gnats are weak fliers, fan-based traps as well as other fly-killing devices may be used to help control free-flying gnats, especially indoors. There are a number of toxic and non-toxic methods of controlling sciarids and their larvae, including diatomaceous earth, powdered cinnamon, or by placing smells they dislike around the plant such as dryer sheets or oils like lavender and peppermint.

To investigate how bad the infestation possibly is, one can place cut-up pieces of potato onto the topsoil, and let them sit for about 72 hours. The larvae will begin to feed on them within the week. Check every few days, pulling out larvae-covered potato pieces.

== See also ==
- Drain fly
