= Non-random segregation of chromosomes =

Non-random segregation of chromosomes is a deviation from the usual distribution of chromosomes during meiosis, that is, during segregation of the genome among gametes. While usually according to the 2nd Mendelian rule (“Law of Segregation of genes“) homologous chromosomes are randomly distributed among daughter nuclei, there are various modes deviating from this in numerous organisms that are "normal" in the relevant taxa. They may involve single chromosome pairs (bivalents) or single chromosomes without mating partners (univalents), or even whole sets of chromosomes, in that these are separated according to their parental origin and, as a rule, only those of maternal origin are passed on to the offspring. It also happens that non-homologous chromosomes segregate in a coordinated manner. As a result, this is a form of Non-Mendelian inheritance.

This article describes cases where non-random segregation is the normal case for the particular organisms or occurs very frequently. A related phenomenon is called meiotic drive or segregation distortion. This is a higher than average transmission of a single chromosome relative to the homologous chromosome in inheritance. This can be due to non-random segregation during meiosis, but also to processes after meiosis that reduce the transmission of the homologous chromosome.

In addition, there are pathological cases that result in aneuploidy and are almost always lethal.

== Background and early history of research ==
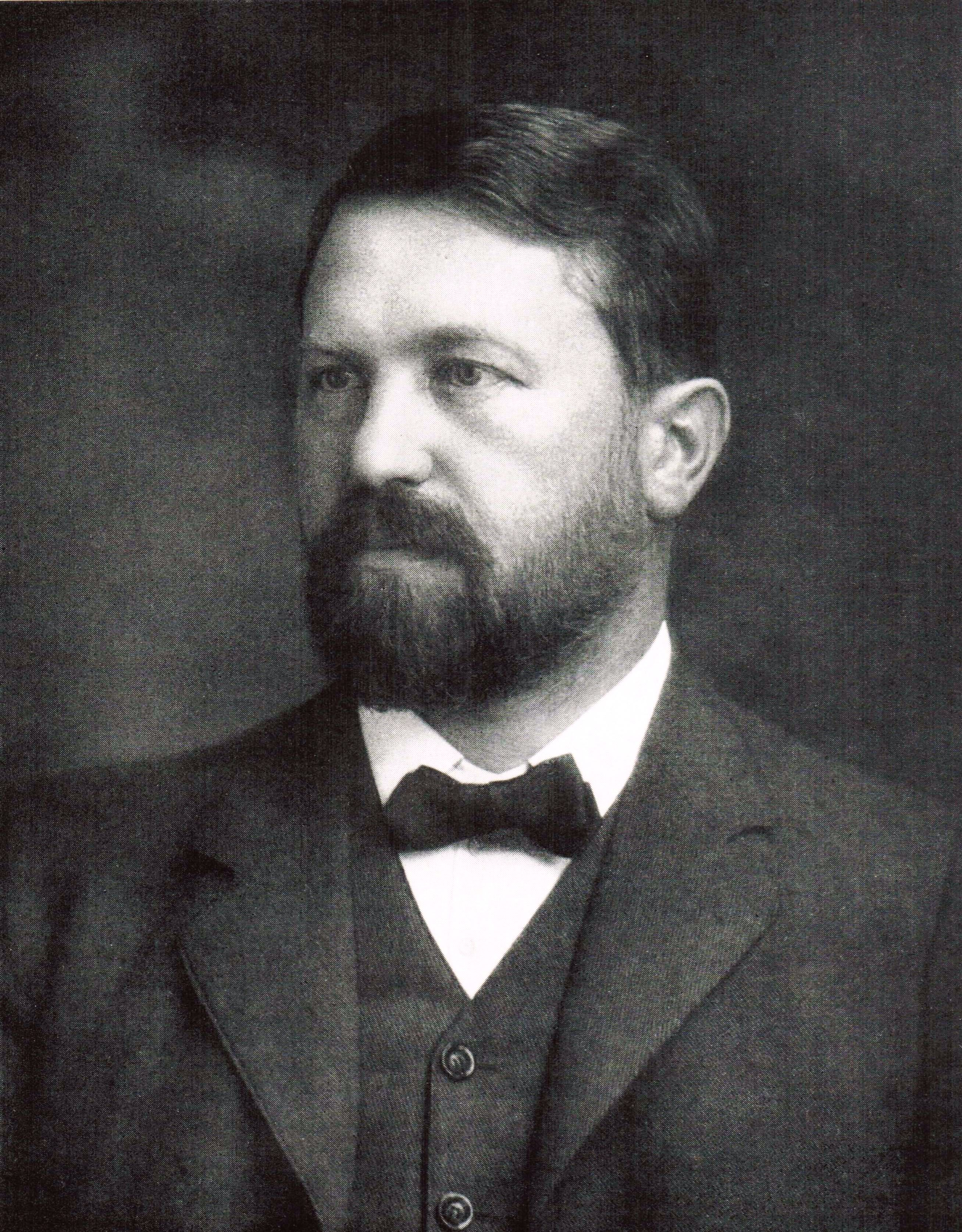
Theodor Boveri 1908

According to the chromosome theory of inheritance formulated by Theodor Boveri in 1904, homologous chromosomes were expected to be randomly distributed among the daughter nuclei during meiosis. The first studies on this question appeared in 1908 and 1909. These papers dealt with spermatogenesis in aphids, i.e. meiosis in the male sex. In aphids, sex determination is mostly done according to the XX/X0 type: females have two X chromosomes, males only one. However, males only appear in one generation towards the end of the year, while otherwise there are only females, which reproduce by parthenogenesis. The question now was how it is achieved that all offspring in sexual reproduction are females. It turned out that meiosis I is inequal, i.e. results in two unequal-sized cells, and the X chromosome always ends up in the larger daughter cell. Only from this cell do two sperm cells emerge after meiosis II, while the smaller cell degenerates. Thus, each sperm - like the egg - contains an X chromosome, and only female offspring (XX) are produced.

Also in 1909, a paper was published on the spermatogenesis of Coreus marginatus. There are two different X chromosomes and no Y chromosome (X_{1}X_{2}0), and in meiosis I both X chromosomes are assigned to the same daughter nucleus. The same is apparently generally true in spiders, many species of which have been studied in subsequent years, as well as in various nematodess and in some aphids. The situation is somewhat more complicated in the American mole cricket Neocurtilla hexadactyla, which Fernandus Payne described in 1916: Here, three sex chromosomes are present (X_{1}X_{2}Y), two of which mate, while X_{1} is present as a univalent (unpaired). Although, as recent studies have confirmed, there is no mechanical linkage, the univalent X chromosome enters the same daughter nucleus that receives the other X chromosome.

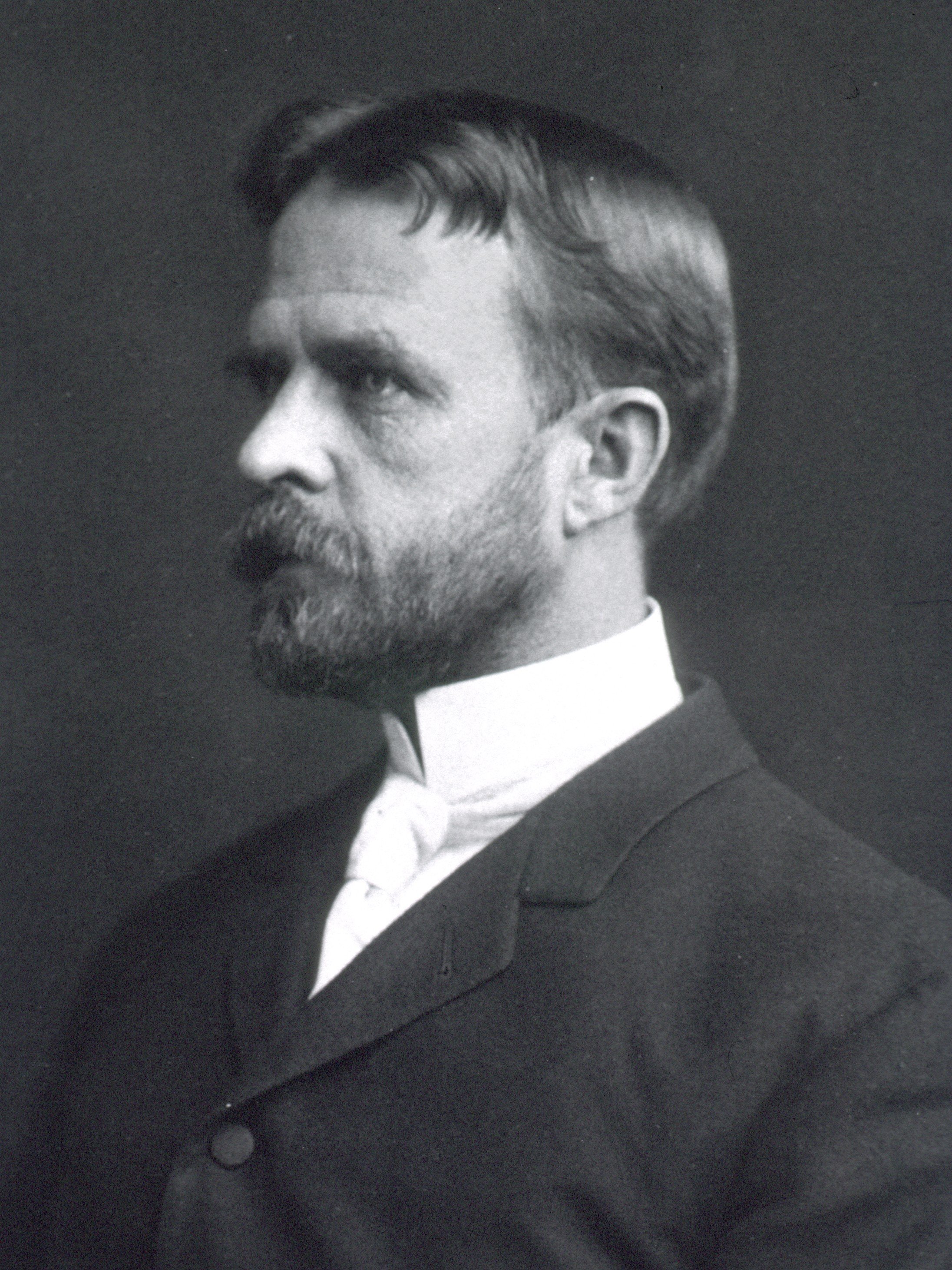
Thomas Hunt Morgan

It was only after all these counter-examples that a study by Eleanor Carothers on locusts appeared in 1917 - in the same journal as Payne's paper (Journal of Morphology) - which was seen as clear evidence for the expected random distribution. While earlier studies had been limited to sex chromosomes because homologous autosomes could not be distinguished, Carothers had found experimental animals in which homologous autosomes could also be partially distinguished. Payne's divergent findings were subsequently ignored, especially as they could not be confirmed in the European mole cricket. Thomas Hunt Morgan, who decisively contributed to the establishment of the chromosome theory of heredity, which was not yet generally accepted at that time, even explicitly wrote in his book The Physical Basis of Heredity (1919) that there was no contradictory evidence against the random segregation of maternal and paternal chromosomes (there is not a single cytological fact opposed to the free assortment of maternal and paternal chromosomes), although he was undoubtedly aware of the work of his former collaborator Payne. It was not until 1951 that Michael J. D. White rediscovered it and confirmed it through his own investigations.

The third basic variant of non-random segregation, in which the complete sets of chromosomes of maternal and paternal origin are separated from each other, was studied - among some other peculiarities - in the 1920s and 30s by Charles W. Metz and co-workers in fungus gnats. Since then, numerous other counterexamples to random segregation have been described in very different creatures. It was not until 2001, however, that a first review paper appeared that was devoted precisely to this topic and was not limited to specific cases. The authors stated that most geneticists are unaware of non-random segregations or consider them rare exceptions. Due to the wide taxonomic distribution of the known cases, they argue that the importance of these phenomena has been underestimated so far.

== Single chromosomes or chromosome pairs ==
We first consider cases where only a single chromosome pair or a single unpaired chromosome (univalent) is affected, in the order of first description in the respective taxon.

=== Aphids ===
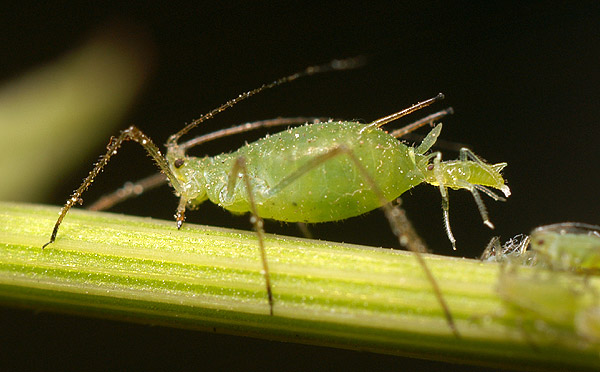
Parthenogenetic birth of an aphid

As mentioned, the first example of non-random segregation described as early as 1908 was the behaviour of the X chromosome during spermatogenesis in aphids. These insects exist for most of the year only as females and reproduce parthenogenetically, i.e. without the participation of males. There is no fertilisation or meiosis, and successive generations are genetically identical. Under certain conditions, mostly due to the decreasing day length towards the end of the vegetation period of the host plants, one generation occurs in which males are also present. This is achieved by the two X chromosomes present in females mating as in meiosis and their number being reduced to 1, resulting in males (X0).

The fact that, after this one bisexual generation, only females are produced again is based, as shown above, on the fact that, during spermatogenesis, the X chromosome is always assigned to the daughter cell from which sperm are produced. Hans Ris described the exact sequence of meiosis in 1942: According to this, the X chromosome does not participate in the movement towards the poles of the spindle apparatus during anaphase, but is stretched between the diverging poles. Also during the subsequent cell division, the chromosome remains in this position. Only at a late stage of furrowing does the furrowing groove shift to one side, and the X chromosome is allocated to the opposite, larger daughter cell. Since only this produces two sperm, all sperm as well as the eggs contain an X chromosome. After fertilisation, eggs are laid, which survive until the beginning of the next growing season and then only produce females (XX), which again reproduce parthenogenetically.

=== Butterflies ===
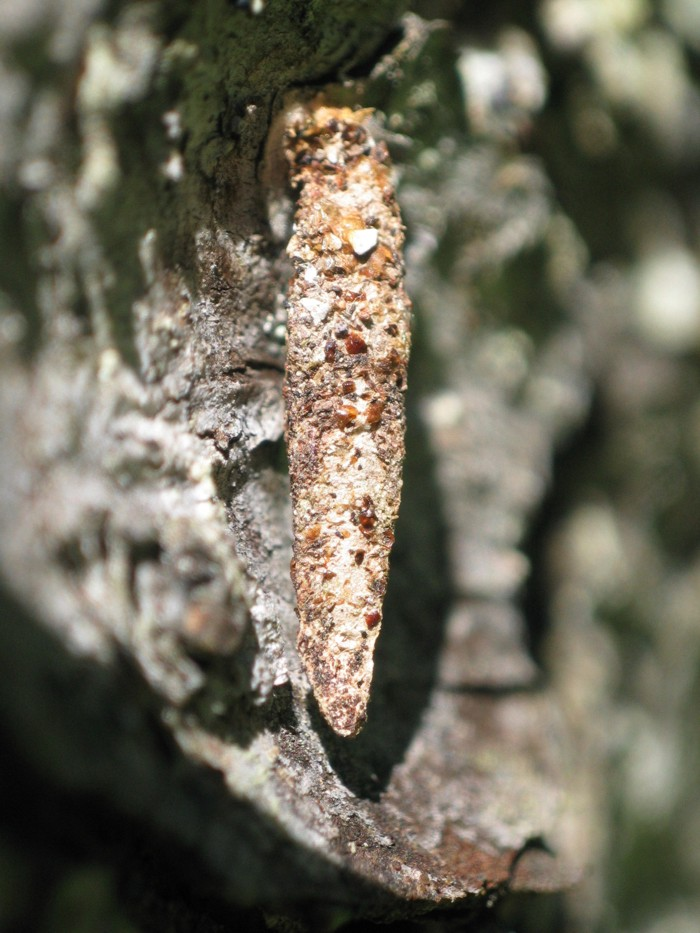
The eponymous tube with which the caterpillar of the tubular bagbearer surrounds itself

In butterflies, the sex of the offspring is not determined as in the most common case among animals, including humans, but by the make-up of the egg. In these cases, the female sex is heterogametic, the male is homogametic. In such cases, one does not speak of X and Y chromosomes, but of Z and W chromosomes. Males have two Z chromosomes (ZZ), females either one Z and one W chromosome (ZW) or only one Z chromosome (Z0). An example of the ZZ/Z0 type is the Taleporia tubulosa. In this species, J. Seiler (1920), an associate of Richard Goldschmidt, studied the inheritance of sex and the behaviour of the univalent Z chromosome during oogenesis. He found that the sex ratio among the offspring depends on the temperature and the age of the mother. At cool temperatures ("room temperature of about 12-16°"), the Z chromosome entered the polar body in 57% of the cases studied at meiosis I and only in 43% in the future egg nuclei. Accordingly, Seiler found an excess of females in the offspring. Conversely, when the chromosome was preferentially allocated to the egg in the incubator at 30-37°, there was a surplus of 62 % male offspring. Similarly, more males were produced when mating occurred a few days after hatching and thus towards the end of the short life of the female Imago. (Meiosis pauses here, as in most invertebrates, in metaphase I and is not completed until after fertilisation. Cf. Stasis of female meiosis). Evidence of non-random segregation in female meiosis has also been found in butterflies of the ZZ/ZW type. In some species of the genera Danaus and Acraea there are females that produce only female offspring (ZW). This is apparently due to the fact that the W chromosome always enters the egg cell and not the polar bodies. This modification of the meiotic chromosome distribution is hereditary and linked to the W chromosome.

=== Fungus gnats ===
The fungus gnats, whose spermatogenesis has some peculiarities (summary at fungus gnat#genetics), have already been mentioned. In meiosis II, a peculiarity occurs with the X chromosome. Normally, in meiosis II (as in mitosis), all chromosomes are divided into the two chromatids that make them up and these are allocated to the two daughter nuclei. In fungus gnats, on the other hand, the X chromosome travels prematurely to one of the spindle poles and only divides there or on the way there. Since a sperm is only produced from the cell formed there, this then contains two X chromosomes, and the zygote after fertilisation accordingly three. One of these X chromosomes is eliminated at an early embryonic stage, thereby restoring the normal female chromosome make-up (XX).

=== Flowering plants ===
The first case of non-random segregation of single chromosomes in a plant was described by Marcus Morton Rhoades in 1942 in maize. This non-randomness occurs when there is an abnormal form of chromosome No. 10 that contains an extra segment. Since this additional segment is recognisable as a knobbed structure in the Pachytene of meiotic prophase, the chromosome is referred to as K10. It occurs particularly in some ancient North American Indian maize varieties. If there is only one K10 and one normal chromosome 10, and in female meiosis I the crossing-over occurs in such a way that the chromatids are of different lengths, then in meiosis II the chromatid containing the knobbed additional segment is about 70% likely to enter the embryo sac and thus the egg cell. The segment is therefore accumulated to a high degree in the inheritance; it exhibits a meiotic drive. This also applies if other chromosomes carry the segment, but only if at least one K10 is present.

A corresponding accumulation of additional chromosome segments has also been described in some other plant species, but has not been studied in detail. Much more numerous are studies on additional chromosomes, the B chromosomes, which show no homology with regular chromosomes and only occur in some of the individuals of a population, i.e. have no essential functions. A non-random segregation of B chromosomes was first described by Catcheside in 1950 in the guayule. In this shrubby composite, the B chromosomes, if plural, do not mate or mate only fleetingly during meiosis I, i.e. they are mostly present as univalents. Nevertheless, they are very likely to migrate to the same pole in anaphase I.

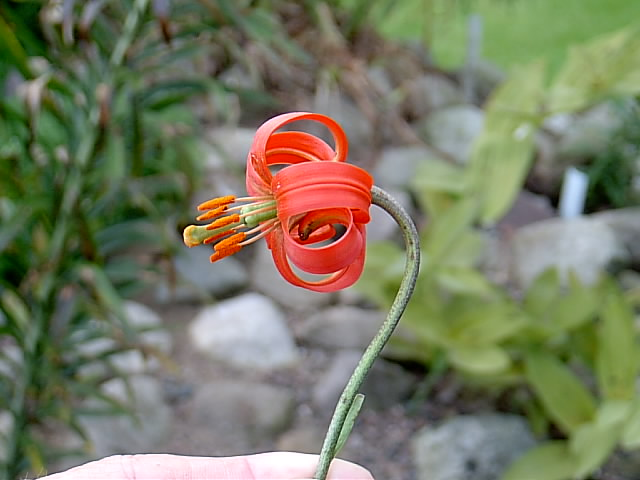
Lilium callosum

Since Catcheside only studied male meiosis, which usually gives rise to four fertile daughter cells, it cannot be concluded that non-random segregation contributes to the accumulation in inheritance that is characteristic of B chromosomes in general. The situation is different in female meiosis, where three of the four daughter nuclei degenerate. In 1957, Hiroshi Kayano described the behaviour of a B chromosome in female meiosis in the Japanese lily species Lilium callosum, which is mostly present only in singular and therefore exists as a univalent. He found that the chromosome is allocated to about 80 % of the future egg cell and is passed on accordingly to 80 % of the offspring.

This work by Kayano seems to be the only one so far to demonstrate the accumulation of a B chromosome as a result of non-random segregation during meiosis in the embryo sac mother cell. In contrast, an accumulation of B chromosomes in plants by a directional nondisjunction in mitoses before or after meiosis has been observed in many cases, as for the first time in 1960 by Sune Fröst in the Crepis pannonica. Both chromatids often end up in the same daughter cell (nondisjunction), and this is directed in such a way that an accumulation in the inheritance results. Non-random segregation in meiosis can therefore only be concluded if directional nondisjunction in mitoses can be excluded. This is largely assured in the case of the Mediterranean sawfly plantain Plantago serraria. and Hypochaeris maculata. Another case is probably in Phleum nodosum.

=== Flies ===
Similar to maize, non-random segregation also occurs in the fruit fly Drosophila melanogaster during female meiosis, when homologous chromosomes are of different lengths and chromosomes with chromatids of different lengths are present as a result of crossing-over during meiosis II. Then, with a probability of about 70 %, the shorter chromatid enters the egg nucleus. This was discovered by E. Novitski in 1951. Later it was also found in Lucilia sericata and Hylemya. So it is apparently a widespread phenomenon in flies.

In Drosophila melanogaster, non-random segregation can also occur during male meiosis. This is the case when the sex chromosomes (X and Y) do not pair during meiosis I. In this case, the unpaired chromosomes usually end up in the same daughter cell. Then the unpaired chromosomes usually end up in the same daughter cell. Accordingly, there are many X0-type males among the offspring, but surprisingly few XXY-type males. The latter is due to the fact that the daughter cells with the XY constitution are disturbed in their development. On the other hand, the X0 males are infertile. The bottom line is that the X chromosome involved is enriched in the inheritance (meiotic drive).

=== Mealybugs ===
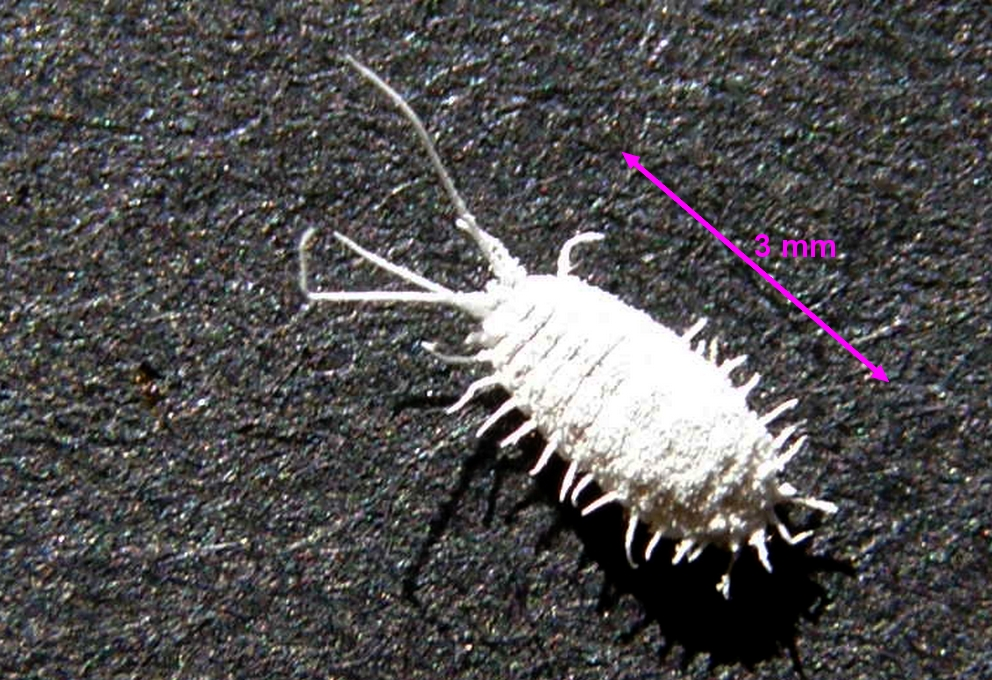
A female of Pseudococcus affinis

B chromosomes are also common in the animal kingdom. In the Mealybug, Uzi Nur described non-random segregation in both sexes in 1962. In oogenesis, the segregation behaviour of the B chromosome depends on the number of Bs present. If two Bs are present, then they mate during reduction division (which is meiosis II here, as it is generally in mealybugs, scale insects and aphids) and segregate in the normal way. However, if only one is present, then in two-thirds of the cases it enters the polar body and only in the remaining third does it enter the ovary. And the unpaired supernumerary B chromosome behaves in the same way if 3 or 5 Bs are present, while the paired ones segregate normally. Overall, therefore, there is a tendency in the female sex to exclude B chromosomes from the inheritance by non-random segregation, which comes into play especially when only one is present. However, this is contrasted in the male sex by a strong tendency to accumulate B chromosomes. This is due to the fact that in this species (as in many other mealybugs and scale insects) half of the meiosis products regularly degenerate. During reduction division (also meiosis II here), all B chromosomes are allocated to the future sperm nucleus with about 90 % probability.

=== Grasshoppers ===
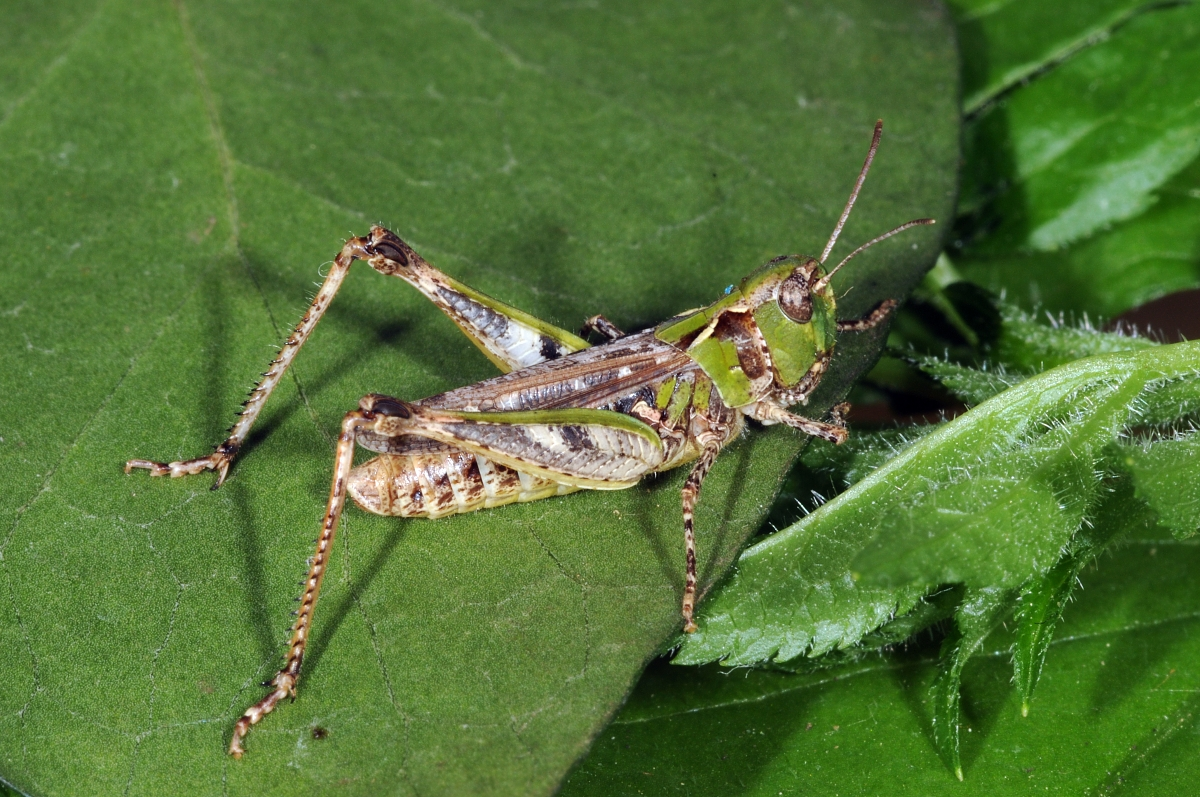
female spotted club cricket

Transmission of B chromosomes has also been studied in various grasshoppers. As in plants, it was found that the number of B chromosomes can increase even before meiosis due to mitotic nondisjunction. In contrast, Zipora Lucov and Uzi Nur found an example of non-random segregation at oogenesis in the North American species Melanoplus femurrubrum in 1973. Since there was never more than one B chromosome, accumulation prior to meiosis was ruled out in this case. Nevertheless, this chromosome was passed to about 80% of the offspring. Hewitt's (1976) study of Myrmeleotettix maculatus was even more informative. Hewitt found that when the eggs were fixed in metaphase I (the time of egg laying), the B chromosomes were mostly already found in the inward half of the division spindle, that is, near the future egg nucleus. The transmission rate of about 75% corresponded to this. How frequent such non-random segregation of B chromosomes is otherwise in grasshoppers cannot yet be estimated. It is true that many locust species are known to have B chromosomes. However, only in a few cases has their transmission been studied, and non-random segregation in meiosis is only one of several ways in which non-Mendelian transmission can occur.

Another chromosomal anomaly that is common in locusts is extra segments on individual chromosomes. Such additional segments can segregate quite randomly, and in fact it was locusts with homologous chromosomes of unequal length in which Carothers first found evidence of random segregation in 1917. In contrast, López-León et al. (1991, 1992) found circumstantial evidence for nonrandom segregation in two locust species: in Eyprepocnemis plorans, an extra segment in the female sex is less likely to be transmitted than the normal homologous chromosome if a B chromosome is also present. Thus, the B chromosome influences the transmission of a regular chromosome pair, while even in this case it follows Mendelian rules. The reduced transmission of the additional segment is most likely due to non-random segregation during oogenesis, because the alternative possibility of differential mortality of zygotes could be excluded. In Chorthippus jacobsi, López-León et al. studied the transmission of different additional segments at three different chromosomes. While all additional segments on chromosomes M_{5} and M_{6} are transmitted normally, accumulation consistently occurs in both sexes when an additional segment is located on the small chromosome S_{8}. Even if both S_{8} chromosomes carry different sized additional segments, they do not follow Mendelian rules, but the shorter segment is preferentially transmitted. Again, non-random segregation during oogenesis can be inferred with high probability. In contrast, how non-Mendelian transmission occurs through the male sex is unclear.

=== Rodents ===
The first description of non-random segregation in a mammal appeared in 1977 and dealt with the Wood lemming. In some populations of this species, up to 80% of the animals are female. At the same time, some of the females have the "male" chromosome constitution XY. The fact that these animals develop into females, although they have a Y chromosome, is due to a mutation on the X chromosome. During meiosis, this mutated chromosome (X*) enters the egg nucleus more frequently than the Y chromosome and is therefore more likely to be transmitted to the offspring. A second example concerns a B chromosome in the Siberian collared lemming Dicrostonyx torquatus. In female meiosis I of this species, unpaired B chromosomes are preferentially assigned to the future egg nucleus and thus accumulate in the inheritance.

In Siberian populations of the house mouse, a variant form of chromosome 1 with two insertions occurs. This elongated variant is passed on by heterozygous females with much higher probability than the normal chromosome 1. As it turned out, this occurs by non-random segregation of the homologous chromosomes or chromatids in both meiotic divisions. As a result, up to 85% of the offspring of a heterozygous female can receive the insertions. However, the latter is only the case if the males used in the crossing experiments are not also carriers of these insertions. If instead homozygous carriers of these insertions were used, i.e. each sperm received the insertions, then the non-randomness in female meiosis was reversed: In this case, only about 1/3 of the offspring of a heterozygous mother received the insertions from this mother. This surprising influence of sperm on meiosis in the oocyte is possible because in mice, as in vertebrates in general, female meiosis pauses in metaphase II until fertilization occurs.

It has been known since 1962 that female mice with only one X chromosome (XO) are fertile, but their daughters have predominantly two X chromosomes. How this happens was unclear for a long time, but according to recent studies it is apparently due to the fact that the univalent X chromosome is preferentially allocated to the future egg nucleus during meiosis I.

== Coordinated segregation of non-homologous chromosomes ==
=== Mechanically coupled univalents ===
That two non-homologous chromosomes segregate in a coordinated manner during meiosis was first described in 1909 in Coreus marginatus. In it, males have two different X chromosomes (X_{1}X_{2}0), and these are both assigned to the same daughter nucleus in meiosis I. Later studies in other bugs revealed that the X chromosomes are linked and their cosegregation was apparently based on this. Thereby, up to five different X chromosomes can be present, and most species also have a Y chromosome that migrates to the opposite spindle pole. Such cosegregation of mechanically coupled sex chromosomes has also been described in spiders, nematodess, stoneflies, ostracods, in a scale insect, and in beetles.

=== Free univalents ===
In some aphid species, males have two different X chromosomes (X_{1}X_{2}0), which are not mechanically linked and yet reach the same spindle pole during meiosis I. This is consistent with the directional segregation mode of a single X chromosome described above. In other aphid species, four different chromosomes probably cosegregate in this manner. A cosegregation of free univalents has also been described in the giant crab spider Delena cancerides. There, males have three different X chromosomes that are not mechanically linked as in other spiders, but are still assigned to the same spindle pole.

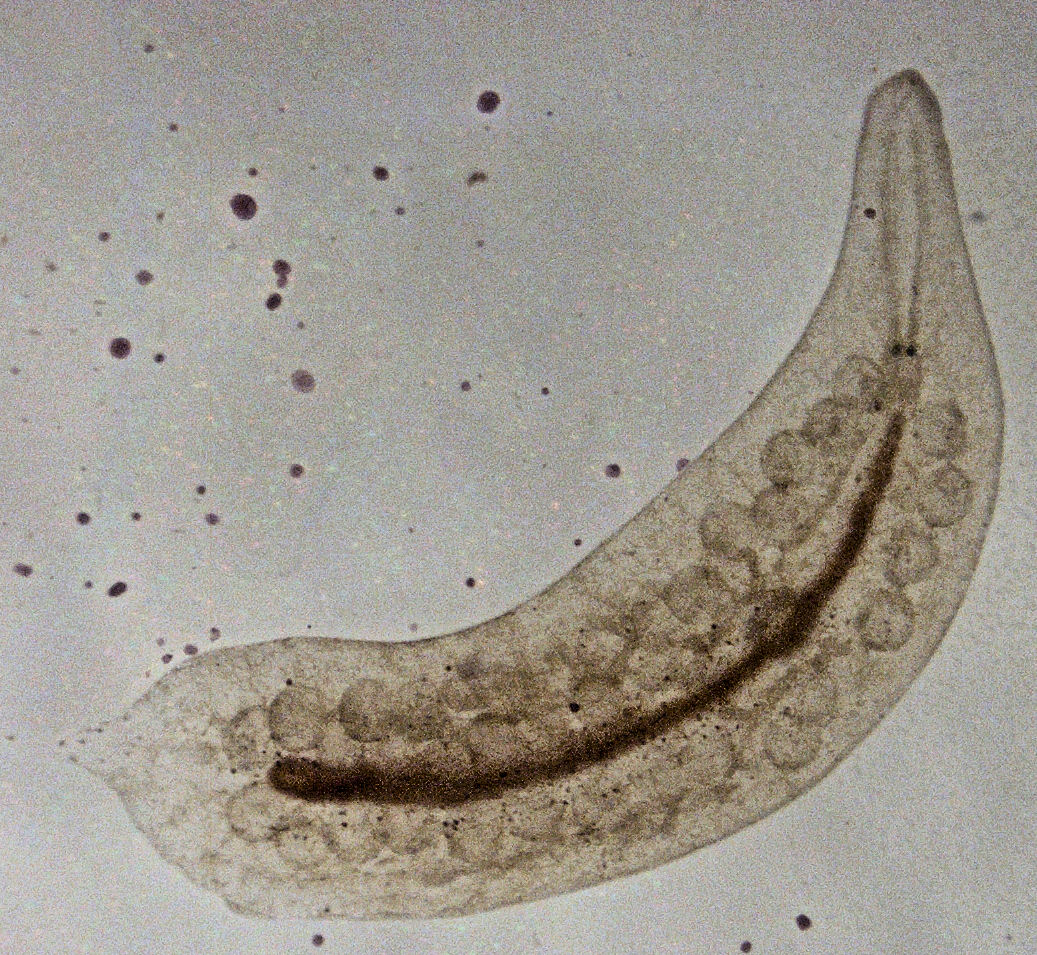
Mesostoma ehrenbergii (Turbellaria)

More interesting are those cases in which free univalents of different species segregate in a regulated manner to opposite spindle poles. This is part of the normal course of meiosis in the spermatogenesis of various Neuroptera, some Alticini, the cricket Eneoptera surinamensis, and the Mesostoma ehrenbergii (Turbellaria). Netwings mostly have one X and one Y chromosome. which do not mate during meiosis. However, some species have multiple univalent sex chromosomes, and univalent B chromosomes may be added. They all segregate in an orderly fashion to the spindle poles. This is called distance segregation. Similar relationships with multiple sex univalents have also been described in some flea beetles. In the cricket Eneoptera surinamensis, three free univalent sex chromomeres (X_{1}X_{2}Y) are present, already migrating to the spindle poles, while the autosomes assemble at the spindle equator. In the whirl worm Mesostoma ehrenbergii only three of the five chromosome pairs mate during meiosis. Thus, three bivalents and four univalents are present, and the univalents also segregate here before the bivalents. In fixed preparations, the univalents are often not correctly distributed. Hilary A. Oakley found the reason for this when she observed the process in a living object. According to this, the univalents move back and forth between the poles in metaphase I, i.e. when the bivalents are at the equator. Usually only one univalent moves, and after a longer pause (five to ten minutes) another one starts to move. This continues until all four are correctly distributed. This is followed by the anaphase, i.e. the segregation of the paired chromosomes.

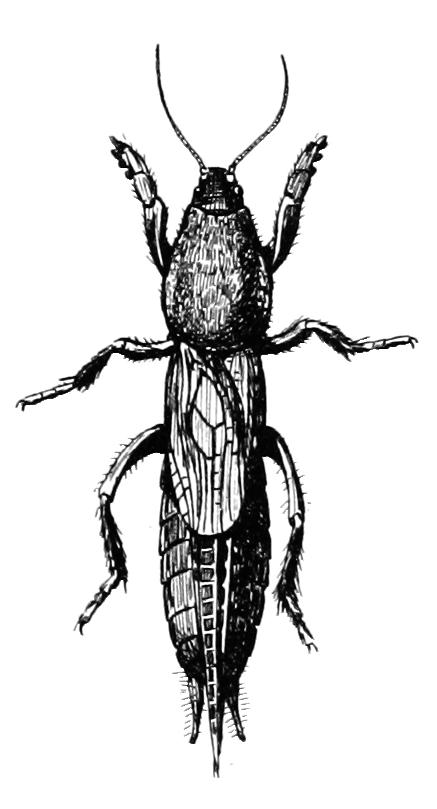
Neocurtilla hexadactyla

Also in the northern mole cricket Neocurtilla hexadactyla already mentioned at the beginning, live observations of meiosis were very informative. There, as in Eneoptera, three sex chromosomes (X_{1}X_{2}Y) are present, but only X_{1} is present as a univalent. In this case, segregation of sex chromosomes also occurs before that of autosomes, in that the X_{2}Y bivalent is already shifted in metaphase I from the metaphase plate toward one spindle pole in such a way that the Y chromosome is located near it, while the univalent X_{1} is located at the other pole. Through micromanipulation experiments in which they shifted the bivalent or the univalent in the spindle, René Camenzind and R. Bruce Nicklas (1968) found that X_{1} is the active element and depends on the orientation of the bivalent. Furthermore, the authors found that there is no mechanical connection between the two. However, an electron microscopic examination revealed some microtubules, which also make up the spindle fibers, and which here appear to form a fine connection between X_{1} and Y. Targeted irradiation of this microtubule junction with UV microbeams often (in about one-third of cases) resulted in X_{1} moving to the other half of the spindle. The same effect was surprisingly seen with irradiation of one of the three spindle fibers where the sex chromosomes were located, whereas irradiation of autosomal spindle fibers had no effect. Dwayne Wise et al. concluded that these four microtubule bundles form an "interacting network" that enables the coordinated segregation of sex chromosomes, i.e., the correct allocation of the X_{1}.

== Complete sets of chromosomes ==
=== Fungus gnats ===
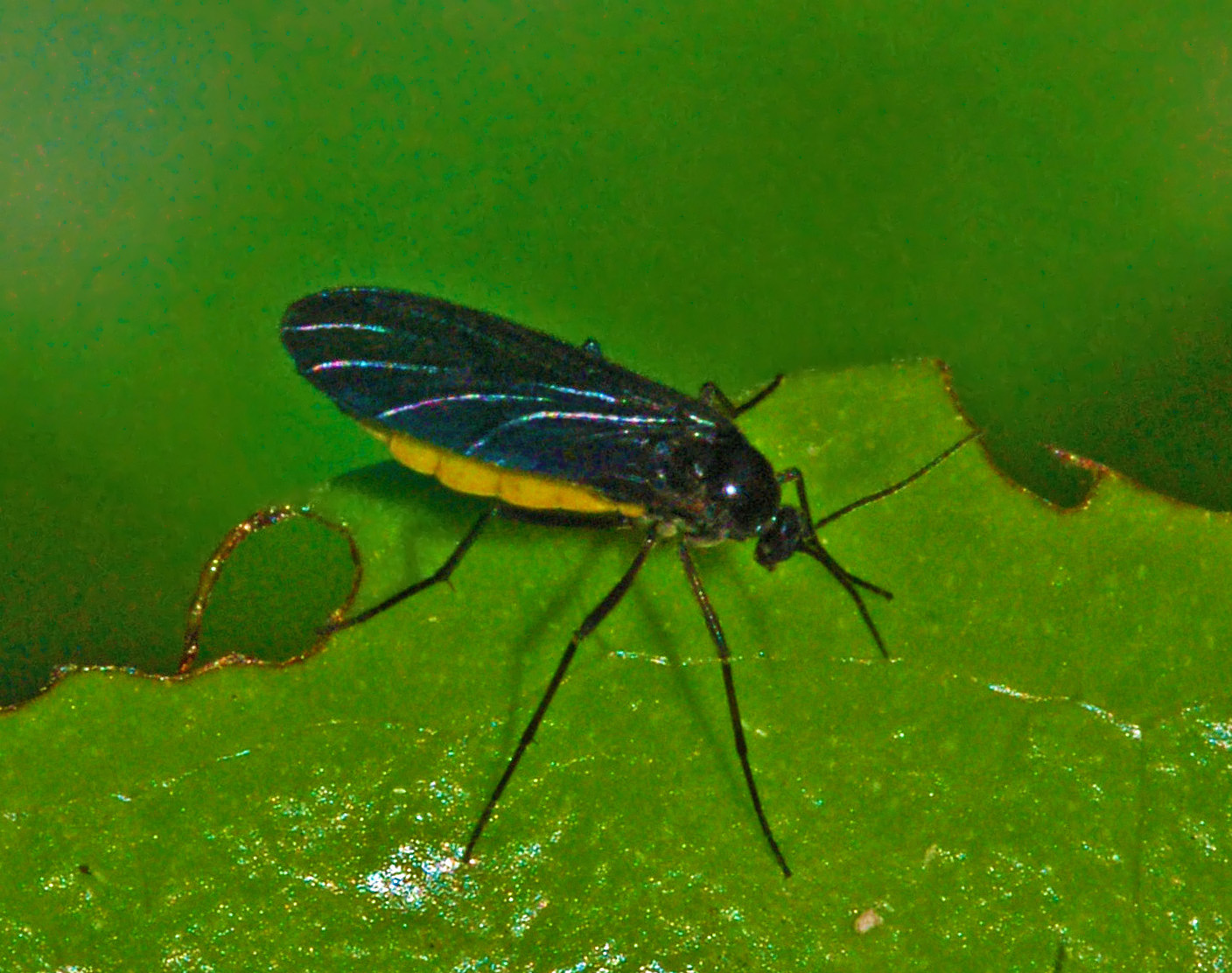
A fungus gnat of the genus Sciaria

The behavior of chromosomes in fungus gnat spermatogenesis is very unusual in several respects. A detail of meiosis II was already discussed above; however, meiosis I is far more remarkable. There the otherwise obligatory pairing of homologous chromosomes is completely omitted, and these are segregated from each other according to their origin - maternal or paternal. Their segregation starts right after the nuclear envelope dissolution, the metaphase is omitted, and the paternal chromosomes enter a small daughter cell which, like the polar bodies, passes away during oogenesis. Thus, all spermatozoa receive only the maternal chromosomes, and males act only as intermediaries between purely female lineages. The construction of the spindle apparatus in this division is also unusual. It is not a bipolar spindle, but merely a half-spindle with only one pole. The maternal chromosomes move towards this pole, the paternal ones away from it.

Some fungus gnats have, in addition to regular chromosomes, germline-limited or L-chromosomes (from limited), which are present only in cells of the germline and are eliminated from somatic cells. These segregate with the maternal regular chromosomes during spermatogenesis, thus enter the sperm unreduced. This doubling of their number is compensated for at an early stage of embryonic development by eliminating excess L chromosomes from the nucleus, so that exactly two always remain.

=== Cecidomyiidae ===
In Cecidomyiidae, spermatozoa also contain only the set of chromosomes of maternal origin, while paternal chromosomes are eliminated during meiosis I. Again, pairing of homologous chromosomes is omitted, cell division is inaequal, and only the maternal chromosomes move to a spindle pole, thereby entering the daughter cell from which two spermatozoa emerge after meiosis II, while the other daughter cell perishes. In addition, there are numerous germline-limited chromosomes, which, like those of fungus gnats, remain with the paternal regular chromosomes and are thus eliminated.

=== Scale insects ===
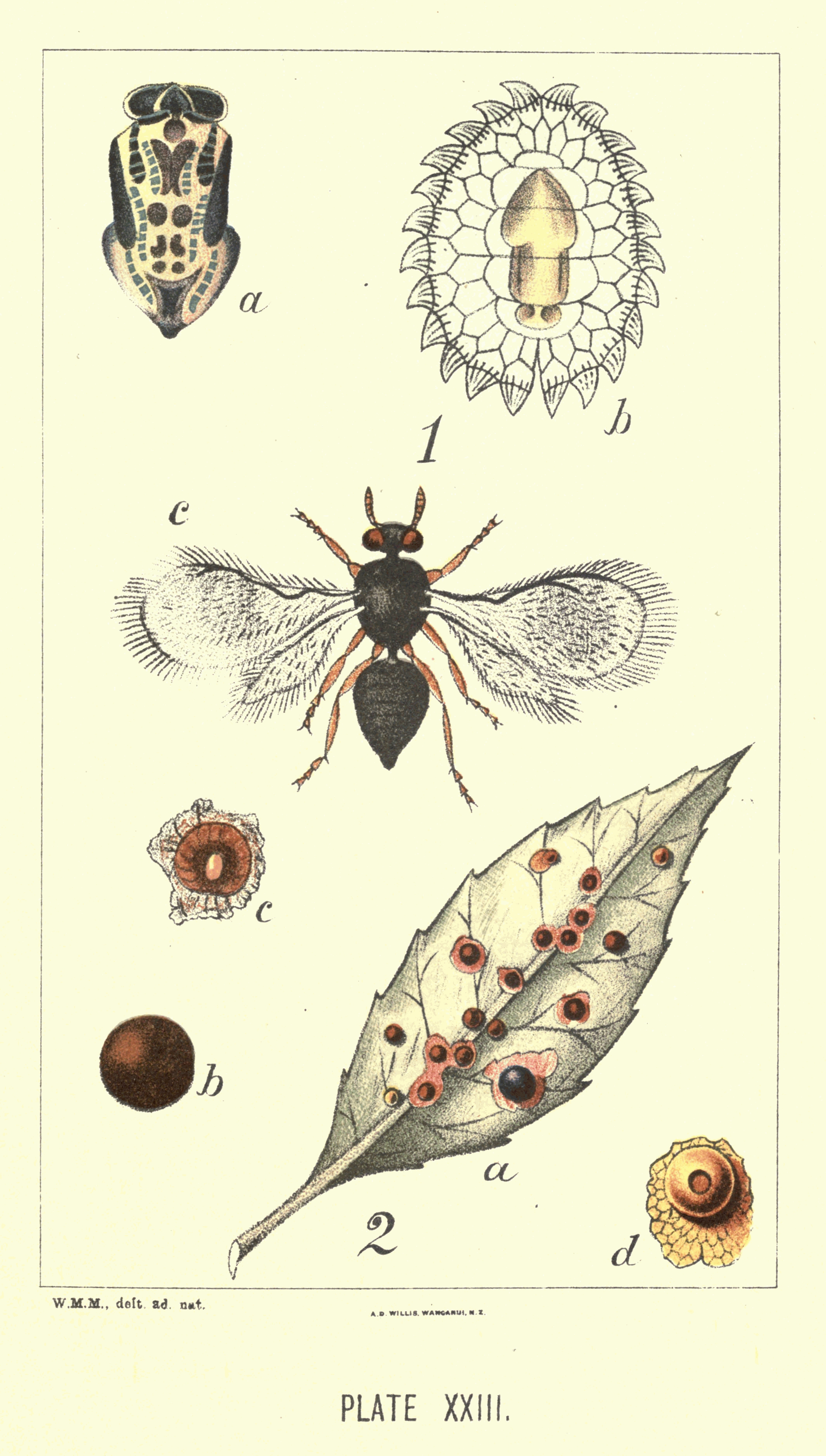
Scale insects: Female shield-shaped, male winged

In most scale insects, males are parahaploid: although they have two sets of chromosomes, only chromosomes of maternal origin are active, and only they are passed on to offspring. Inactivation of the paternal chromosomes occurs at an early embryonic stage (blastula), when the chromosomes become highly condensed (heterochromatized). (This also occurs in humans, where in the female sex one of the two X chromosomes becomes heterochromatic). Elimination from inheritance can occur in several ways; only one occurs during meiosis. This is called the lecanoid chromosome system. Meiosis is inverse in scale insects, as in the aphids discussed above, that is, the actual reduction division is meiosis II. In the lecanoid mode, the chromosomes form a "double metaphase plate" with all maternal chromosomes on one side and all paternal chromosomes on the other. (In the normal case, chance rules here.) In anaphase, the two complete sets then step apart, each forming its own daughter nucleus. Since meiosis II is not associated with cell division here, and since the two daughter formations of the first division also reunite, a four-nucleated cell eventually results (as is generally the case in scale insect spermatogenesis). Of the 4 nuclei, however, only the two with the maternal chromosomes then become sperm nuclei; the other two become more and more condensed and finally perish.

=== Plants ===
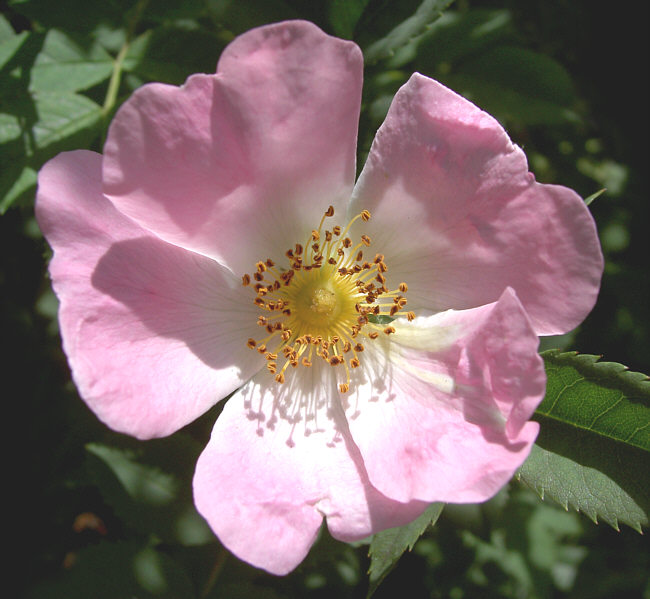
Flower of Rosa canina

In the plant kingdom, polyploidy is very common. For the most part, these are allopolyploid species in which each chromosome finds a homologous partner during meiosis. But there are also species with an odd number of chromosome sets. These can generally reproduce only apomictic, that is, bypassing meiosis and fertilization, because univalents are randomly distributed among the daughter nuclei during meiosis. However, some plants are known in which univalents are distributed non-randomly and therefore can reproduce sexually. The oldest example is the dog roses, in which this was discovered as early as 1922. They are pentaploid, that is, they have five sets of chromosomes. Of these, only two mate during meiosis in both sexes, so there are 7 bivalents and 21 univalents. In the female sex, i.e., in the embryo sac mother cell, all the univalents migrate undivided at meiosis I to the spindle pole that lies in the direction of the micropyle. Since the embryo sac is then formed there with the oocyte, it thus receives 4 complete sets of chromosomes. In pollenmeiosis, on the other hand, many univalents remain in anaphase I or II (so-called lagging) and are thus lost. This chromosome loss is so high that more than 1/10 of the pollen grains only contain a haploid set of those chromosomes that were paired during meiosis. And since only these haploid pollen grains are functional, the complete pentaploid chromosome set is restored at fertilization. In this way, 3 of the 5 sets of chromosomes are transmitted exclusively through the female line, while the remaining two behave normally.

The Leucopogon juniperinus is triploid, and of its 3 chromosome sets only two mate during meiosis I. The univalents of the third set are distributed directionally, and unlike dog roses in both sexes. Pollen meiosis here, as in related species (Tribus Stypheleae) is associated with inequivalent cell division: Three of the four daughter nuclei assemble at one end of the initially still undivided pollen mother cell and form three small cells there, which subsequently do not develop further. Thus, only one of the meiosis products gives rise to a pollen grain, and this is mostly haploid as a result of the directional segregation of the univalents in meiosis I, i. e. the univalents are eliminated from the pollen nucleus here not by lagging but by a directional distribution. In the embryo sac mother cell, on the other hand, they all migrate towards the micropyle with a greatly increased probability and thus preferentially enter the oocyte. Although the directional distribution in this species is by no means 100% in both sexes and therefore results in many aneuploid gametes, it is effective enough to allow high fertility.

The South American sweetgrass Andropogon ternatus is also triploid, and during meiosis one set of chromosomes remains unpaired. In anaphase I, the univalents in both sexes remain between the segregating half-bivalents and form their own third nucleus, which is included in one of the two daughter cells. In female meiosis, this is the daughter cell facing the micropyle. Thus, in agreement with the two plant species discussed previously, the univalents are allocated directionally to the micropylar side. However, since here the embryo sac is formed at the other end of the tetrad facing the chalaza, this results in the elimination of the univalents from the inheritance. The compensation for this is done by the pollen, in that apparently only those pollen grains which arise from the binucleate meiocytes and are therefore diploid, develop normally and become fertile.

== Significance ==
Fernando Pardo-Manuel de Villena and Carmen Sapienza discussed the significance of these non-randomnesses in a 2001 review limited to non-random segregation of single chromosomes or chromosome pairs. From the widespread occurrence of such phenomena (in plants, insects, and vertebrates) and the diversity of the respective sequence, they conclude that a functional asymmetry of spindle poles - one of the prerequisites of non-random segregation - is probably present in principle and not only exceptionally. This is also true for humans, where non-random segregation occurs when structurally abnormal chromosomes are present as a result of Robertsonian translocations. Elsewhere, the two authors argue for a significance of non-random segregation of structurally different homologous chromosomes (as in Robertson translocations) in the emergence of new species in evolution (speciation).

Despite publications about non-random segregation in major journals and symposia the potential implications of a multitude of findings were ignored for several decades.

== Stem cells and non-random chromosome segregation ==
Non-random segregation of chromosomes is also found in mitosis when stem cells divide. Adult stem cells maintain the mature tissues of metazoans. Declines in their functions are related to tissue ageing. They reproduce in two manners, firstly in a way that their progeny will differentiate, and thus contribute functionally to the tissue, secondly remaining uncommitted and replenishing the stem cell pool. They play a dual role of generating the various cells that comprise mature tissue by differentiation, while also self-replicating just to sustain the stem cell population. They achieve this divergence through asymmetric cell division. The mitotic asymmetry with non-random segregation of chromosomes arises from unequal partitioning of chromosomes according to the age of their template DNA strands. As explained by the immortal DNA strand hypothesis, non-random chromosome segregation has a unique significance in asymmetric stem cell division; the progeny carrying chromosomes with "newly synthesized" DNA has a greater probability of having mutations because it has gone through a higher number of replications as compared to the segregated counterpart containing majorly "old DNA". As a consequence, the cell carrying "new DNA" likely differentiates into progenitor cell and the other cell carrying "old DNA" likely renews as a stem cell with less mutation alterations.

Pre-existing vs newly generated Histone 3 is distinguished by phosphorylation at threonine 3. H3T3P separates sister chromatids enriched with diverse pools of H3 in order to coordinate asymmetric segregation of "old" H3 into germ stem cells and that male germline activity requires tight regulation of H3T3 phosphorylation.

== Literature ==
- Bernard John: Meiosis. Cambridge University Press, Cambridge u. a. 1990. Kapitel Preferential segregation, page 238–247
- Fernando Pardo-Manuel de Villena, Carmen Sapienza: Nonrandom segregation during meiosis: the unfairness of females. In: Mammalian Genome 12, page 331–339 (2001). PMID 11331939, doi:10.1007/s003350040003
