= Phaenocora =

Scientific classification
- Kingdom: Animalia
- Phylum: Platyhelminthes
- Order: Rhabdocoela
- Family: Typhloplanidae
- Genus: Phaenocora; Ehrenberg, 1837

Genus of flatworms

Phaenocora is a genus of flatworms belonging to the family Typhloplanidae.

The genus has almost cosmopolitan distribution.

Species:

- Phaenocora achaeorum Nasonov, 1919
- Phaenocora acheorum Nasonov, 1919
