= Serine/threonine kinase haspin =

Enzyme found in humans

HASPIN
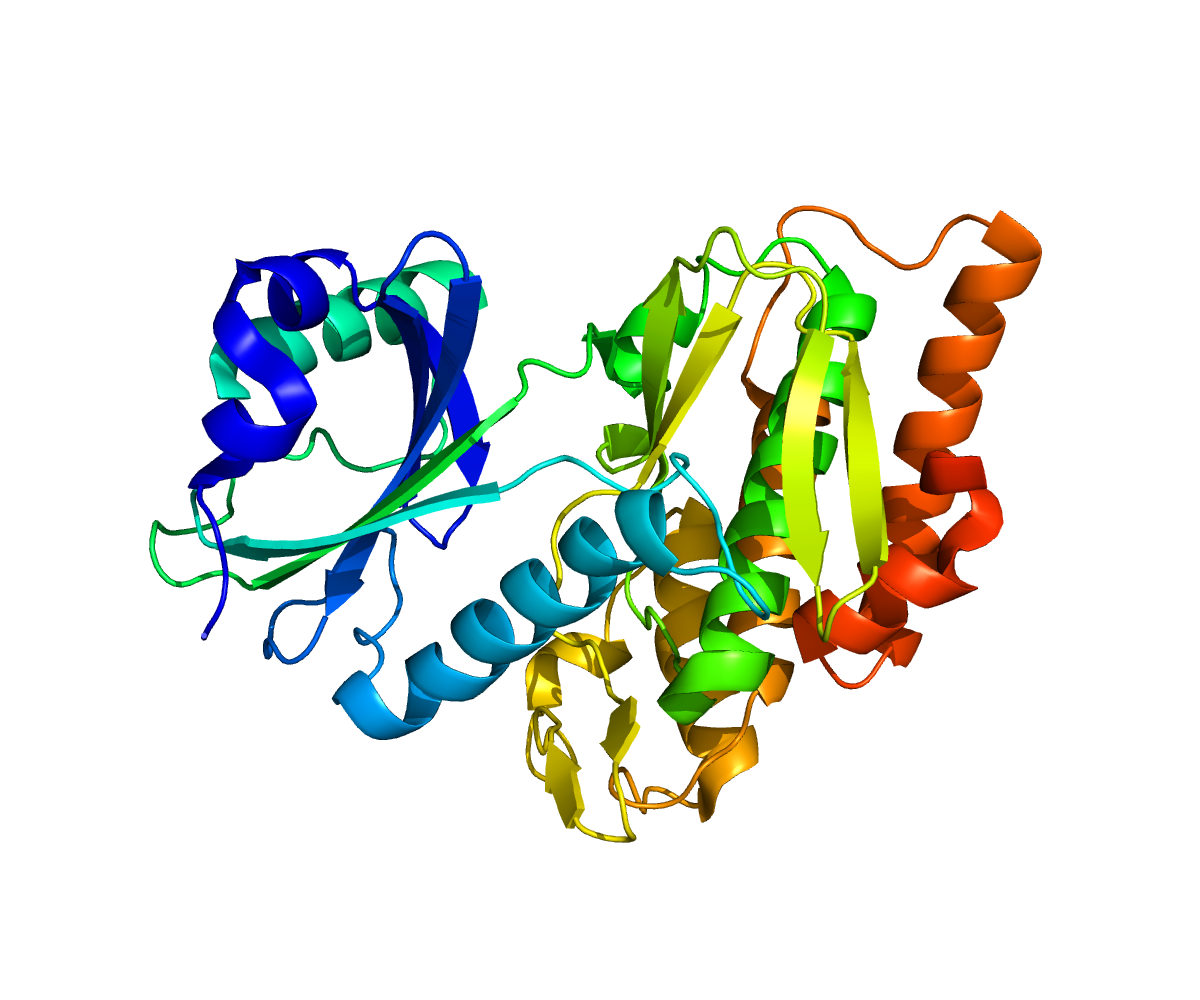

Identifiers
- Aliases: HASPIN, GSG2, germ cell associated 2, haspin, histone H3 associated protein kinase
- External IDs: OMIM: 609240; MGI: 1194498; GeneCards: HASPIN
Available structures
PDB	Ortholog search: PDBe RCSB
PDB	List of PDB id codes 2VUW, 2WB8, 3DLZ, 3E7V, 3F2N, 3FMD, 3IQ7, 4OUC, 4QTC, 5HTC, 5HTB
Enzyme activity
EC #	BRENDA	ExPASy	KEGG	MetaCyc
2.7.11.1	↗	↗	↗	↗

Gene location (Human)
Chr.	Chromosome 17 (human)
Band	17p13.2	Start	3,723,903 bp
Band	17p13.2	End	3,726,699 bp

Gene location (Mouse)
Chr.	Chromosome 11 (mouse)
Band	11 B4|11 45.25 cM	Start	73,026,311 bp
Band	11 B4|11 45.25 cM	End	73,029,120 bp
RNA expression pattern
Bgee	Human / Mouse (ortholog); Top expressed in: pancreatic ductal cell; secondary oocyte; ventricular zone; testicle; tibialis anterior muscle; ganglionic eminence; bone marrow cell; sperm; mucosa of ileum; stromal cell of endometrium / Top expressed in: spermatid; seminiferous tubule; spermatocyte; zygote; primary oocyte; secondary oocyte; tail of embryo; genital tubercle; primitive streak; epiblast; More reference expression data
BioGPS	n/a
Gene ontology
Molecular function	transferase activity; nucleotide binding; kinase activity; protein serine/threonine kinase activity; protein binding; histone kinase activity (H3-T3 specific); ATP binding; protein kinase activity
Cellular component	cytoplasm; centrosome; chromosome; cytoskeleton; nucleus; spindle
Biological process	intracellular signal transduction; phosphorylation; mitotic sister chromatid cohesion; protein localization to chromosome, centromeric region; cell cycle; protein phosphorylation; chromatin organization; mitotic cell cycle
Sources:Amigo / QuickGO
Orthologs
Databases	NCBI: entry; OMA: entry
Species	Human	Mouse
Entrez	83903	14841
Ensembl	ENSG00000177602	ENSMUSG00000050107
UniProt	Q8TF76	Q9Z0R0
RefSeq (mRNA)	NM_031965	NM_010353
RefSeq (protein)	NP_114171	NP_034483
Location (UCSC)	Chr 17: 3.72 – 3.73 Mb	Chr 11: 73.03 – 73.03 Mb
PubMed search
- Wikidata
View/Edit Human	View/Edit Mouse

Serine/threonine-protein kinase haspin is an enzyme that in humans is encoded by the HASPIN gene (previously GSG2). During mitosis, Haspin phosphorylates the histone H3 at 'Thr-3' (H3T3P).
