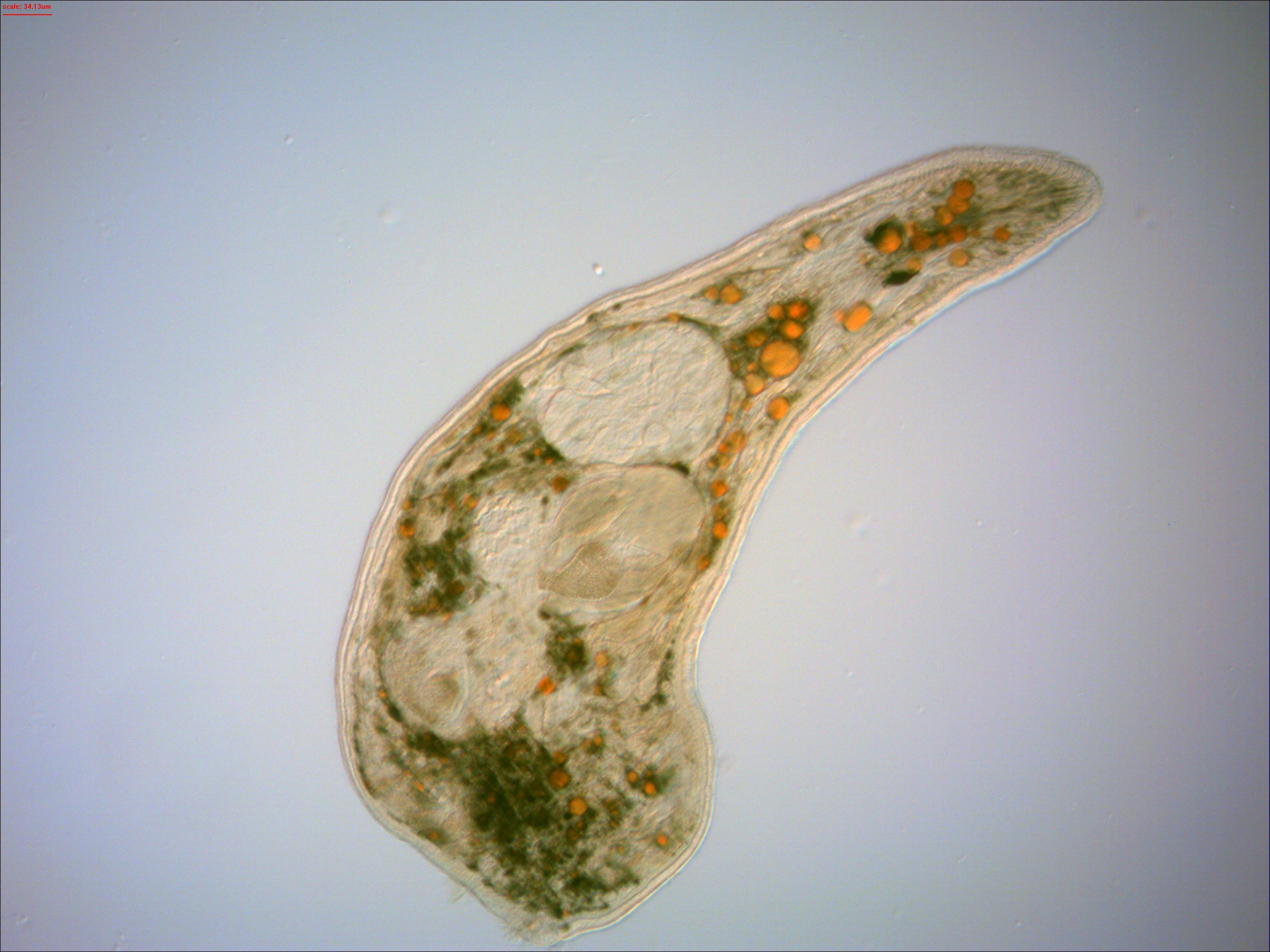
- Strongylostoma elongatum

Scientific classification
- Kingdom: Animalia
- Phylum: Platyhelminthes
- Order: Rhabdocoela
- Family: Typhloplanidae
- Genus: Strongylostoma; Ørsted, 1844

= Strongylostoma =

Genus of flatworms

Strongylostoma is a genus of flatworms belonging to the family Typhloplanidae.

Species:

- Strongylostoma caecum Sekera, 1911
- Strongylostoma cirratum Beklemischev, 1921
- Strongylostoma coecum Sekera, 1912
- Strongylostoma devleeschouweri Van Steenkiste, Gobert, Davison, Kolasa & Artois, 2011
- Strongylostoma dicorymbum Marcus, 1946
- Strongylostoma elongatum Hofsten, 1907
- Strongylostoma gonocephalum (Silliman, 1884)
- Strongylostoma levandovskii Nasonov, 1924
- Strongylostoma radiatum (O.F.Müller, 1773)
- Strongylostoma rosaceum Higley, 1918
- Strongylostoma simplex Meixner, 1915
