= Opistomum pallidum =

Scientific classification
- Kingdom: Animalia
- Phylum: Platyhelminthes
- Order: Rhabdocoela
- Family: Typhloplanidae
- Genus: Opistomum
- Species: O. pallidum

Binomial name
- Opistomum pallidum Schmidt, 1848

Synonyms
- Opistomum vejdovskyi (Sekera, 1912); Opistomum schultzeanum (Diesing, 1862); Typhloplana schultzeana (Diesing, 1862); Typhloplana pallida (Schmidt, 1848)

Species of flatworm

Opistomum pallidum is a species of rhabdocoel flatworm in the family Typhloplanidae.

== Description ==
The animal is 2 to 4.5 mm long. It possesses no eyes. The pharynx is caudally oriented and situated near the posterior end of the body.

== Taxonomy ==
The species was described by Eduard Oscar Schmidt in 1848.

== Distribution and habitat ==
It is known from Europe and Virginia (USA). It inhabits freshwater habitats, but is absent from streams and rivers.

== Ecology and behavior ==
The species is found in Autumn, Winter and Spring. It is known to feed on naidid oligochaetes.
