= Rhynchomesostoma rostratum =

Scientific classification
- Kingdom: Animalia
- Phylum: Platyhelminthes
- Order: Rhabdocoela
- Family: Typhloplanidae
- Genus: Rhynchomesostoma
- Species: R. rostratum

Binomial name
- Rhynchomesostoma rostratum (O. F. Müller, 1773)

Species of flatworm

Rhynchomesostoma rostratum is a species of rhabdocoel flatworms in the family Typhloplanidae.

== Description ==
The animal is 1.5 to 3.5 mm long and transparent. The anterior end is retractable.

== Taxonomy ==
It was described by Otto Friedrich Müller in 1774 as Fasciola rostrata.

== Distribution and habitat ==
The species has been recorded in Europe, India, Kenya, Siberia, and the US.

== Ecology and behavior ==
It preys on oligochaetes, cladocerans, copepods, other microturbellarians, and mosquito larvae and other aquatic insects. It is preyed upon by the flatworm Phaenocora unipunctata.
