= Castrada =

Scientific classification
- Kingdom: Animalia
- Phylum: Platyhelminthes
- Order: Rhabdocoela
- Family: Typhloplanidae
- Genus: Castrada; Schmidt, 1861

Genus of worms

Castrada is a genus of flatworms belonging to the family Typhloplanidae.

The species of this genus are found in Europe.

Species:

- Castrada affinis Hofsten, 1907
- Castrada annebergensis Luther, 1946
