= Opistomum =

Scientific classification
- Kingdom: Animalia
- Phylum: Platyhelminthes
- Order: Rhabdocoela
- Family: Typhloplanidae
- Genus: Opistomum; Schmidt, 1848

Synonyms
- Mesopharynx diglena Schmarda, 1859; Ophistoma Luther, 1905; Opisthostomum Schmarda, 1859; Opistoma Graff, 1882; Opistomum diglena Schmarda, 1859; Turbella diglena Schmarda, 1859

Genus of flatworms

Opistomum is a genus of flatworms in the family Typhloplanidae.

== Species ==
- Opistomum arsenii Nasonov, 1917
- Opistomum dimitrii Nasonov, 1919
- Opistomum fuscum Weise, 1942
- Opistomum immigrans Ax, 1956
- Opistomum mazedonicum (An der Lan, 1939)
- Opistomum pallidum Schmidt, 1848
- Opistomum tundrae Nasonov, 1923

Data source:GBIF
