= Non-Mendelian inheritance =

Type of pattern of inheritance

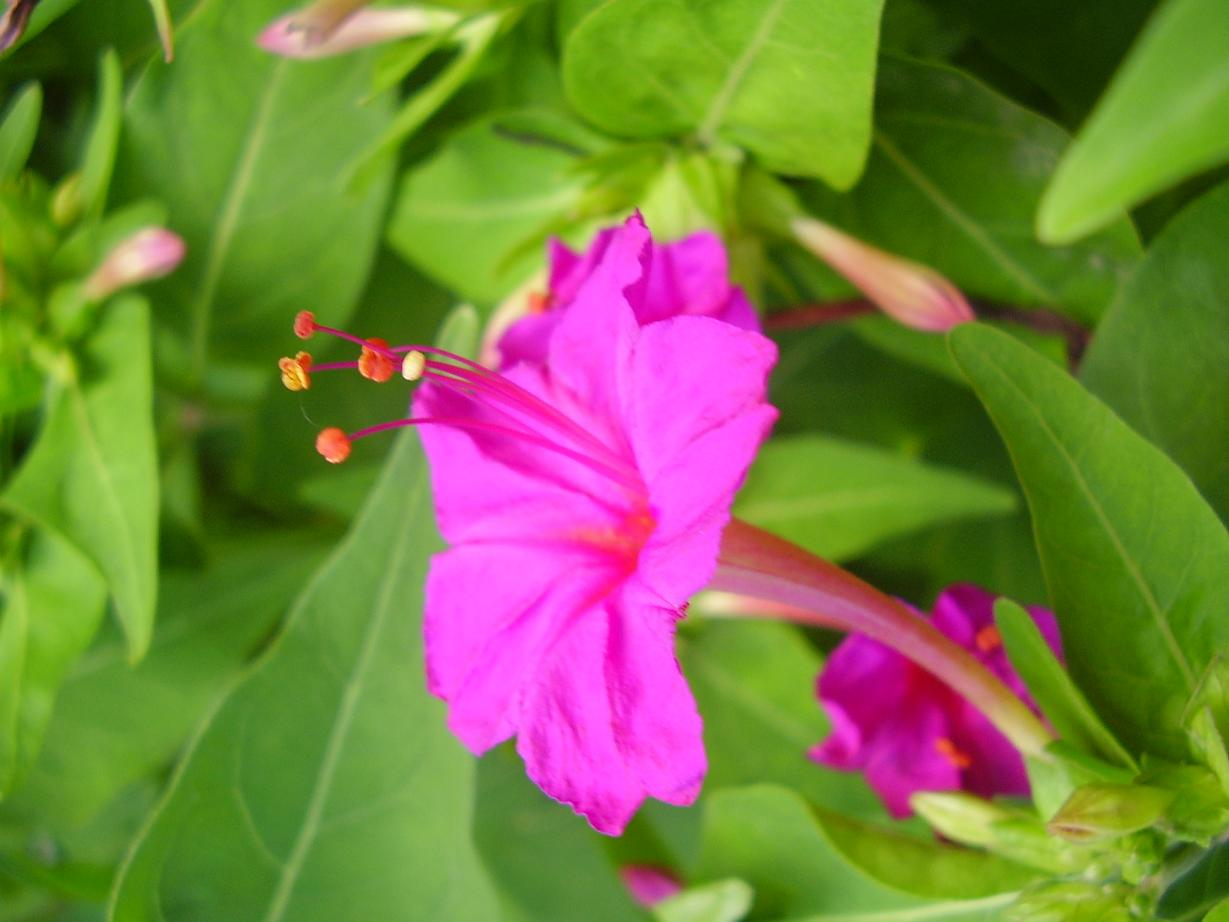
Mirabilis jalapa

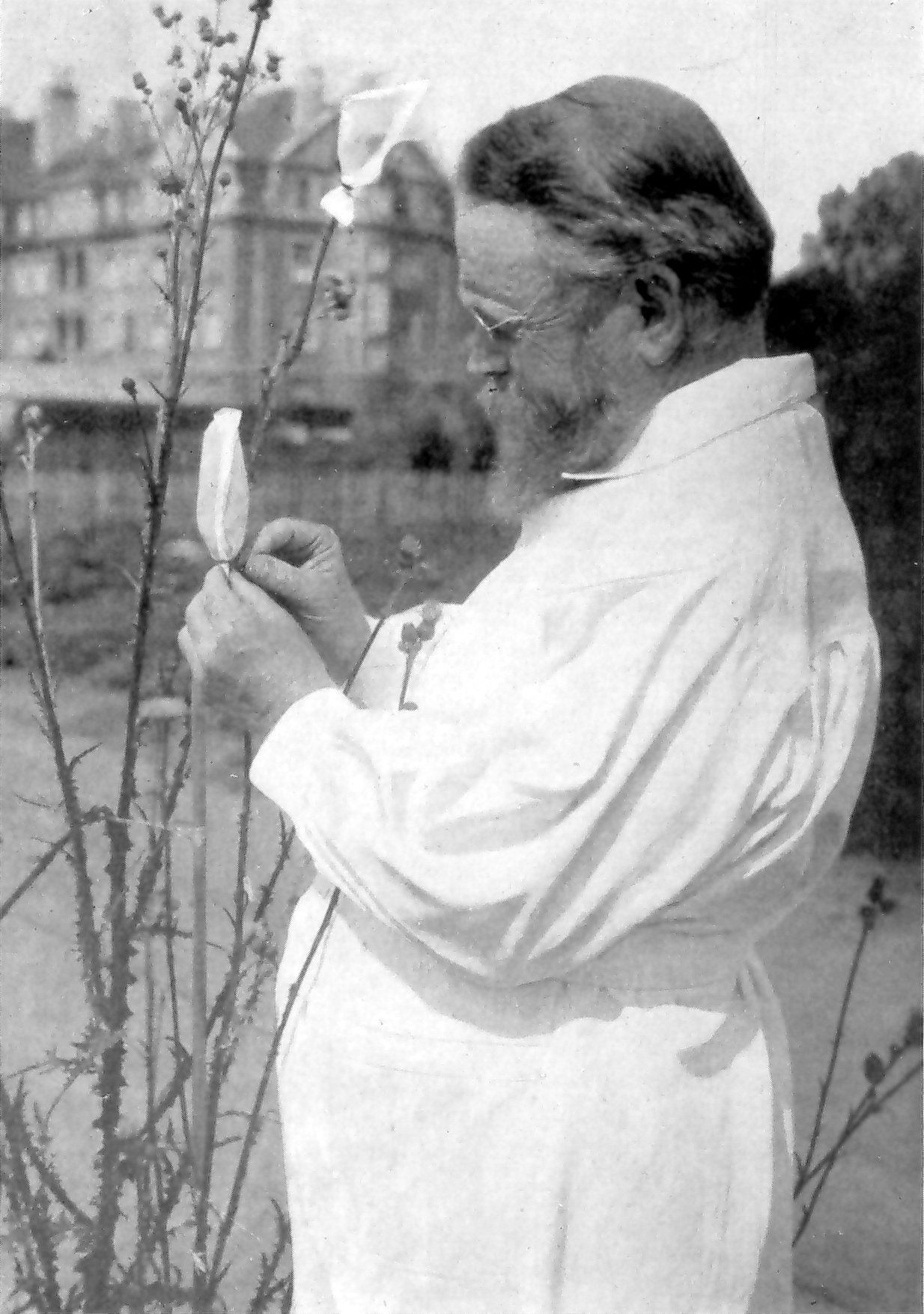
Carl Correns

Non-Mendelian inheritance is any pattern in which traits do not segregate in accordance with Mendel's laws. These laws describe the inheritance of traits linked to single genes on chromosomes in the nucleus. In Mendelian inheritance, each parent contributes one of two possible alleles for a trait. If the genotypes of both parents in a genetic cross are known, Mendel's laws can be used to determine the distribution of phenotypes expected for the population of offspring. There are several situations in which the proportions of phenotypes observed in the progeny do not match the predicted values.

Certain inherited diseases and their presentation display non-Mendelian patterns, complicating the making of predictions from family history.

== Types ==
Incomplete dominance, codominance, multiple alleles, and polygenic traits follow Mendel's laws, display Mendelian inheritance, and are explained as extensions of Mendel's laws.

=== Incomplete dominance ===
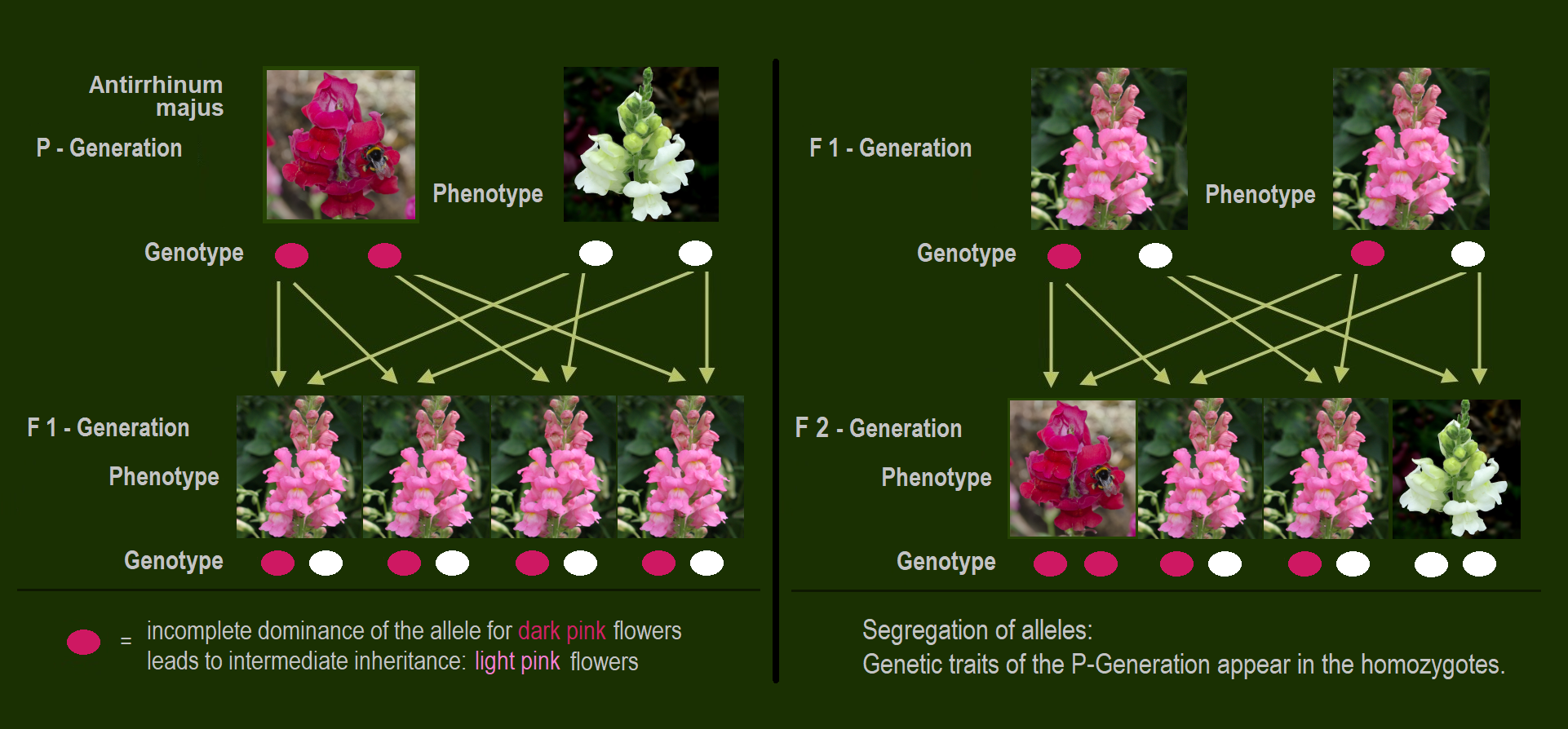

In cases of intermediate inheritance due to incomplete dominance, the principle of dominance discovered by Mendel does not apply. Nevertheless, the principle of uniformity works, as all offspring in the F_{1}-generation have the same genotype and same phenotype. Mendel's principle of segregation of genes applies too, as in the F_{2}-generation homozygous individuals with the phenotypes of the P-generation appear. Intermediate inheritance was first examined by Carl Correns in flower colour of Mirabilis jalapa. Antirrhinum majus also shows intermediate inheritance of the pigmentation of the blossoms.

=== Co-dominance ===
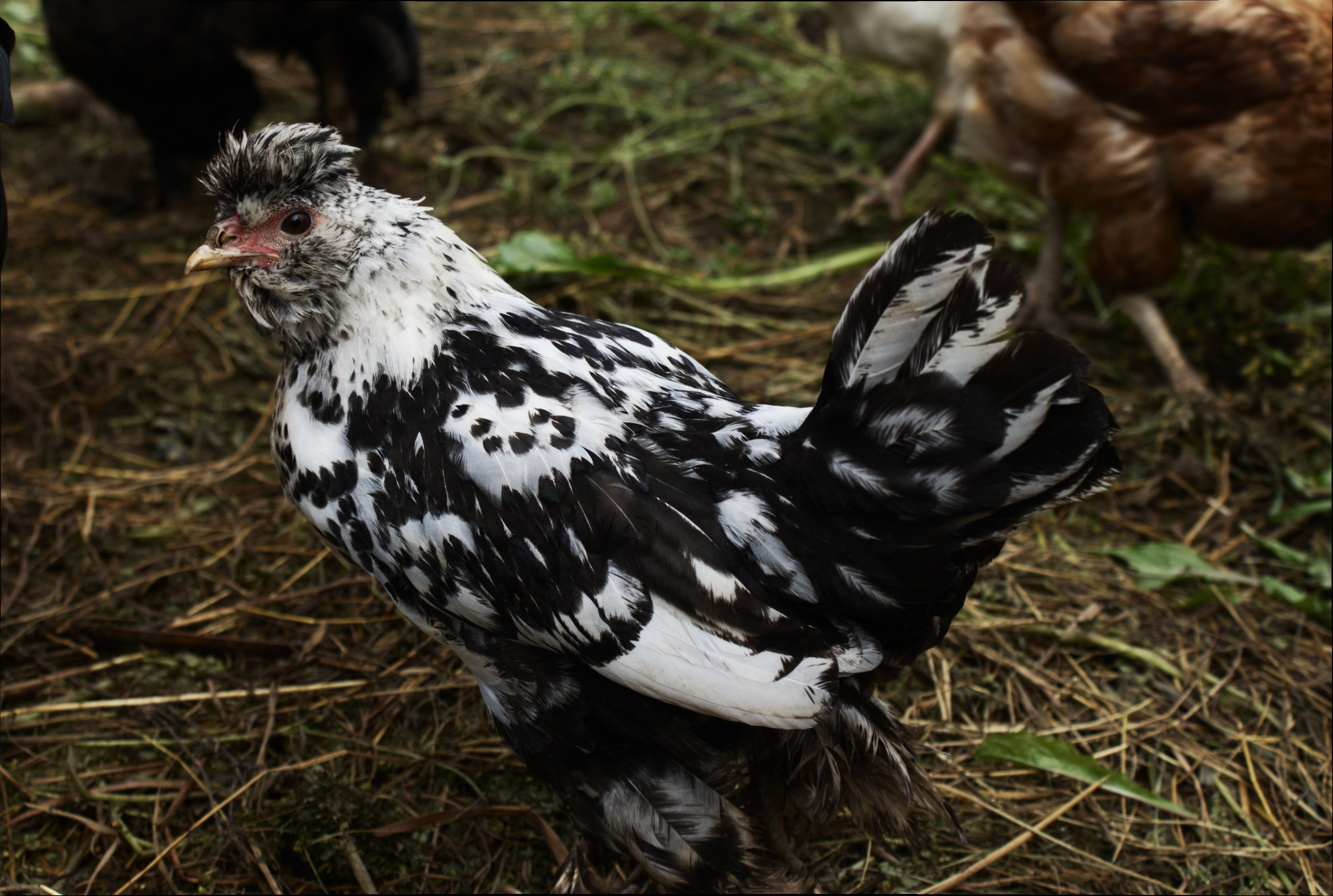
Co-dominant expression of genes for plumage colours.

In cases of co-dominance, the genetic traits of both different alleles of the same gene-locus are clearly expressed in the phenotype. For example, in certain varieties of chicken, the allele for black feathers is co-dominant with the allele for white feathers. Heterozygous chickens have a colour described as "erminette", speckled with black and white feathers appearing separately. Many human genes, including one for a protein that controls cholesterol levels in the blood, show co-dominance too. People with the heterozygous form of this gene produce two different forms of the protein, each with a different effect on cholesterol levels.

=== Genetic linkage ===
When genes are located on the same chromosome and no crossing over took place before the segregation of the chromosomes into the gametes, the genetic traits will be inherited in connection, because of the genetic linkage. These cases constitute an exception to the Mendelian rule of independent assortment.

=== Multiple alleles ===
In Mendelian inheritance, genes have only two alleles, such as a and A. Mendel consciously chose pairs of genetic traits, represented by two alleles for his inheritance experiments. In nature, such genes often exist in several different forms and are therefore said to have multiple alleles. An individual usually has only two copies of each gene, but many different alleles are often found within a population. A rabbit's coat color is determined by a single gene that has at least four different alleles. They display a pattern of a dominance-hierarchy that can produce four coat colors. In the genes for the dog coat colours there are four alleles on the Agouti-locus. The allele "aw" is dominant over the alleles "at" and "a" but recessive under "Ay".

Many other genes have multiple alleles, including the human genes for ABO blood type.

=== Epistasis ===
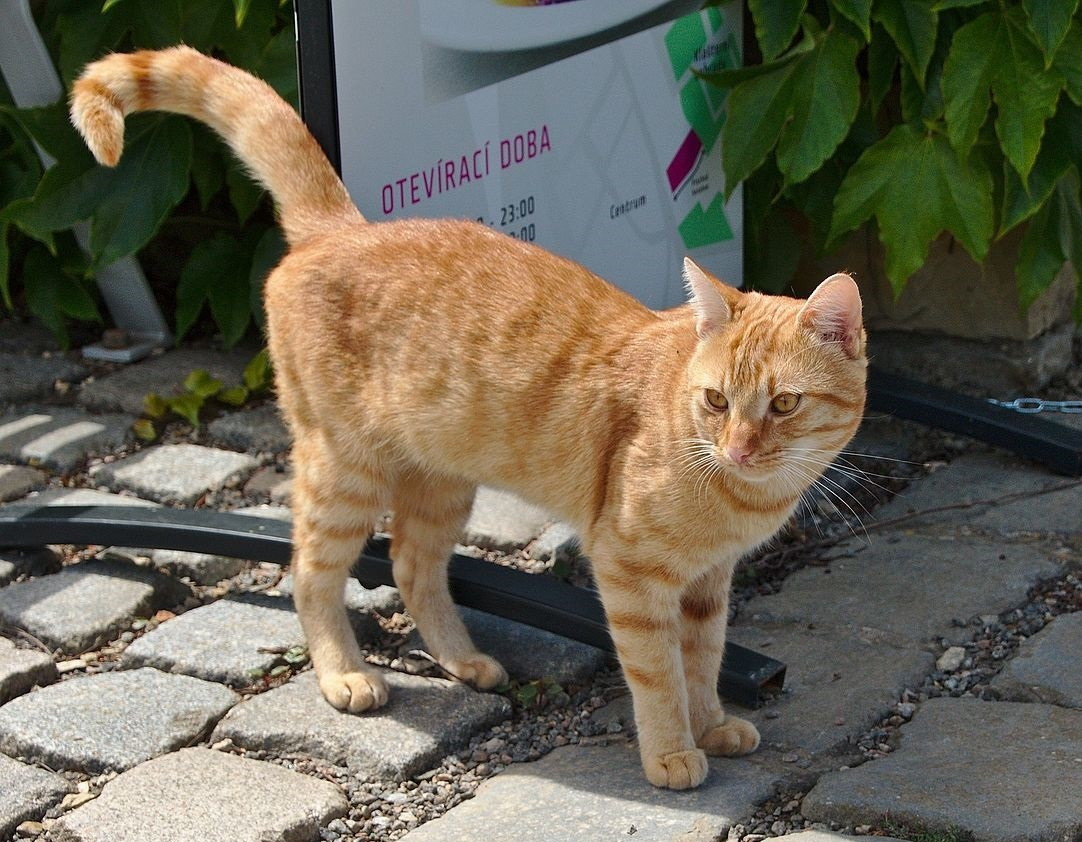
In the genepool of cats (Felis catus) there is a recessive allele for orange coat on the X-Chromosome. In a male the Y-Chromosome cannot compensate this, so a tomcat with that allele is born orange. This allele is epistatic over some other coat color genes.

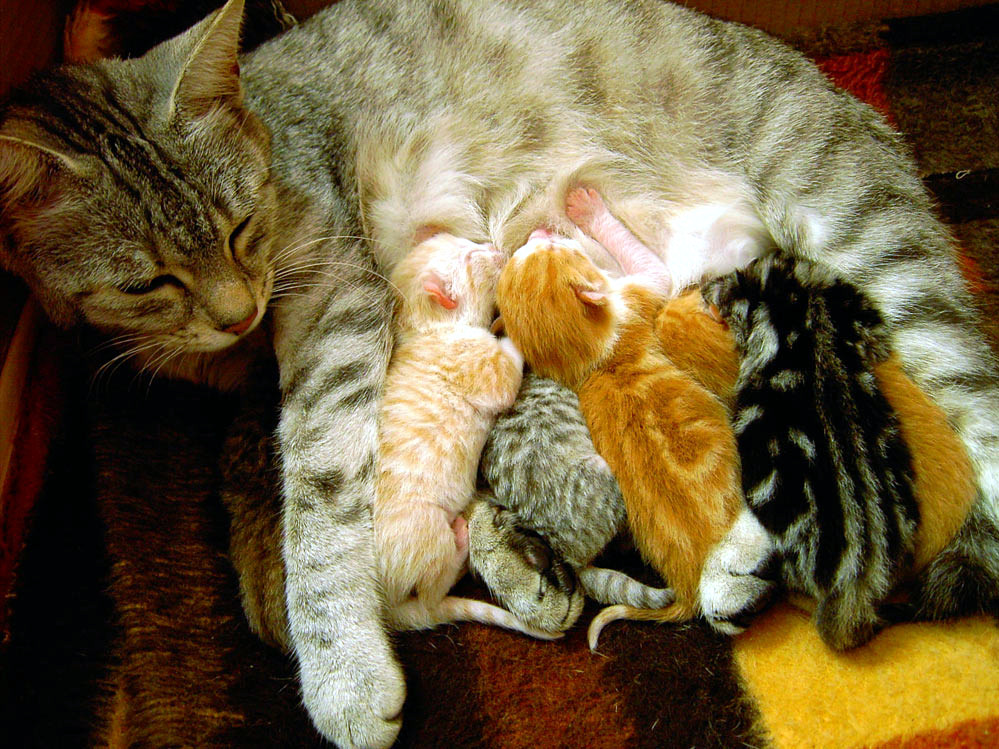
A heterozygous cat with kittens from an orange tomcat: 50 % are orange, 50 % can produce eumelanin. Here the segregation of her two alleles, one dominant for the ability to produce eumelanin, one recessive for orange, was crucial for the colour of the kittens. With the young males it is decisive which of the two X-Chromosomes they received from the mother, because the Y-Chromosome does not contain a corresponding allele from the father. In the young females it is also decisive which X-Chromosome they got from the mother, because they each have an allele for orange from the father and only homozygotes become orange.

If one or more genes cannot be expressed because of another genetic factor hindering their expression, this epistasis can make it impossible even for dominant alleles on certain other gene-loci to have an effect on the phenotype. An example in dog coat genetics is the homozygosity with the allele "e e" on the Extension-locus making it impossible to produce any other pigment than pheomelanin. Although the allele "e" is a recessive allele on the extension-locus itself, the presence of two copies leverages the dominance of other coat colour genes. Domestic cats have a gene with a similar effect on the X-chromosome.

=== Sex-linked inheritance ===
Genetic traits located on gonosomes sometimes show specific non-Mendelian inheritance patterns. Individuals can develop a recessive trait in the phenotype dependent on their sex—for example, colour blindness and haemophilia (see gonosomal inheritances). As many of the alleles are dominant or recessive, a true understanding of the principles of Mendelian inheritance is an important requirement to also understand the more complicated inheritance patterns of sex-linked inheritances.

=== Extranuclear inheritance ===
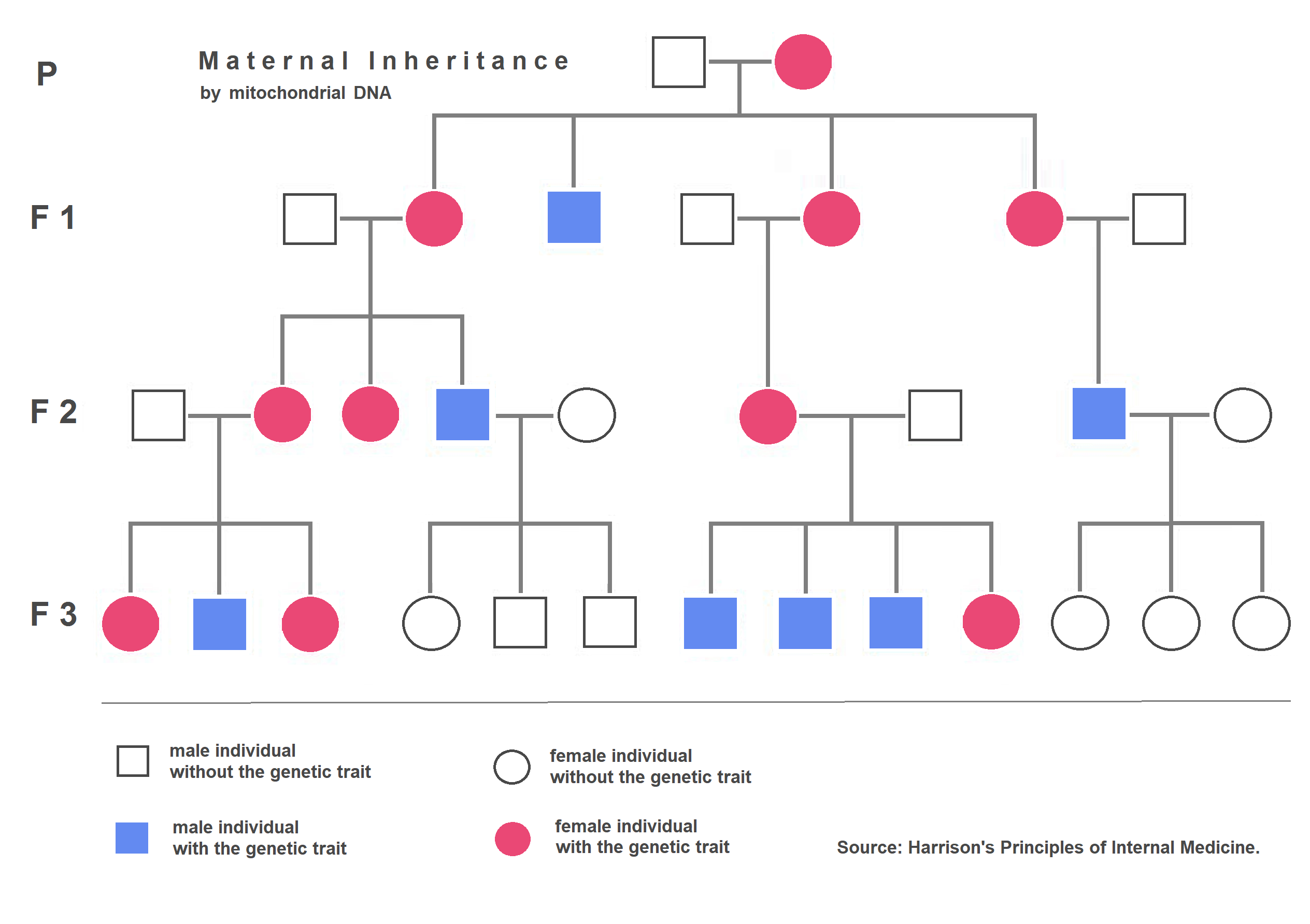
Example of a pedigree for a genetic trait inherited by mitochondrial DNA in animals and humans. Offspring of the males with the trait don't inherit the trait. Offspring of the females with the trait always inherit the trait (independently from their own sex).

Extranuclear inheritance (also known as cytoplasmic inheritance) is a form of non-Mendelian inheritance also first discovered by Carl Correns in 1908. While working with Mirabilis jalapa, Correns observed that leaf colour was dependent only on the genotype of the maternal parent. Based on these data, he determined that the trait was transmitted through a character present in the cytoplasm of the ovule. Later research by Ruth Sager and others identified DNA present in chloroplasts as being responsible for the unusual inheritance pattern observed. Work on the poky strain of the mould Neurospora crassa begun by Mary and Hershel Mitchell ultimately led to the discovery of genetic material in the mitochondria, the mitochondrial DNA.

According to the endosymbiont theory, mitochondria and chloroplasts were once free-living organisms that were each taken up by a eukaryotic cell. Over time, mitochondria and chloroplasts formed a symbiotic relationship with their eukaryotic hosts. Although the transfer of a number of genes from these organelles to the nucleus prevents them from living independently, each still possesses genetic material in the form of double stranded DNA.

It is the transmission of this organellar DNA that is responsible for the phenomenon of extranuclear inheritance. Both chloroplasts and mitochondria are present in the cytoplasm of maternal gametes only. Paternal gametes (sperm for example) do not have cytoplasmic mitochondria. Thus, the phenotype of traits linked to genes found in either chloroplasts or mitochondria are determined exclusively by the maternal parent.

In humans, mitochondrial diseases are a class of diseases, many of which affect the muscles and the eye.

=== Polygenic traits ===
Many traits are produced by the interaction of several genes. Traits controlled by two or more genes are said to be polygenic traits. Polygenic means "many genes" are necessary for the organism to develop the trait. For example, at least three genes are involved in making the reddish-brown pigment in the eyes of fruit flies. Polygenic traits often show a wide range of phenotypes. The broad variety of skin colour in humans comes about partly because at least four different genes probably control this trait.

=== Non-random segregation ===
Non-random segregation of chromosomes is a deviation from the usual distribution of chromosomes during meiosis and in some cases of mitosis.

=== Gene conversion ===
Gene conversion can be one of the major forms of non-Mendelian inheritance. Gene conversion arises during DNA repair via DNA recombination, by which a piece of DNA sequence information is transferred from one DNA helix (which remains unchanged) to another DNA helix, whose sequence is altered. This may occur as a mismatch repair between the strands of DNA which are derived from different parents. Thus the mismatch repair can convert one allele into the other. This phenomenon can be detected through the offspring non-Mendelian ratios, and is frequently observed, e.g., in fungal crosses.

=== Infectious heredity ===
Another form of non-Mendelian inheritance is known as infectious heredity. Infectious particles such as viruses may infect host cells and continue to reside in the cytoplasm of these cells. If the presence of these particles results in an altered phenotype, then this phenotype may be subsequently transmitted to progeny. Because this phenotype is dependent only on the presence of the invader in the host cell's cytoplasm, inheritance will be determined only by the infected status of the maternal parent. This will result in a uniparental transmission of the trait, just as in extranuclear inheritance.

One of the most well-studied examples of infectious heredity is the killer phenomenon exhibited in yeast. Two double-stranded RNA viruses, designated L and M, are responsible for this phenotype. The L virus codes for the capsid proteins of both viruses, as well as an RNA polymerase. Thus the M virus can only infect cells already harbouring L virus particles. The M viral RNA encodes a toxin that is secreted from the host cell. It kills susceptible cells growing in close proximity to the host. The M viral RNA also renders the host cell immune to the lethal effects of the toxin. For a cell to be susceptible it must therefore be either uninfected or harbour only the L virus.

The L and M viruses are not capable of exiting their host cell through conventional means. They can only transfer from cell to cell when their host undergoes mating. All progeny of a mating involving a doubly infected yeast cell will also be infected with the L and M viruses. Therefore, the killer phenotype will be passed down to all progeny.

Heritable traits that result from infection with foreign particles have also been identified in Drosophila. Wild-type flies normally fully recover after being anesthetized with carbon dioxide. Certain lines of flies have been identified that die off after exposure to the compound. This carbon dioxide sensitivity is passed down from mothers to their progeny. This sensitivity is due to infection with σ (Sigma) virus, a rhabdovirus only capable of infecting Drosophila.

Although this process is usually associated with viruses, recent research has shown that the Wolbachia bacterium is also capable of inserting its genome into that of its host.

=== Genomic imprinting ===
Genomic imprinting represents yet another example of non-Mendelian inheritance. Just as in conventional inheritance, genes for a given trait are passed down to progeny from both parents. However, these genes are epigenetically marked before transmission, altering their levels of expression. These imprints are created before gamete formation and are erased during the creation of germ line cells. Therefore, a new pattern of imprinting can be made with each generation.

Genes are imprinted differently depending on the parental origin of the chromosome that contains them. In mice, the insulin-like growth factor 2 gene undergoes imprinting. The protein encoded by this gene helps to regulate body size. Mice that possess two functional copies of this gene are larger than those with two mutant copies. The size of mice that are heterozygous at this locus depends on the parent from which the wild-type allele came. If the functional allele originated from the mother, the offspring will exhibit dwarfism, whereas a paternal allele will generate a normal-sized mouse. This is because the maternal Igf2 gene is imprinted. Imprinting results in the inactivation of the Igf2 gene on the chromosome passed down by the mother.

Imprints are formed due to the differential methylation of paternal and maternal alleles. This results in differing expression between alleles from the two parents. Sites with significant methylation are associated with low levels of gene expression. Higher gene expression is found at unmethylated sites. In this mode of inheritance, phenotype is determined not only by the specific allele transmitted to the offspring, but also by the sex of the parent that transmitted it.

=== Mosaicism ===
Individuals who possess cells with genetic differences from the other cells in their body are termed mosaics. These differences can result from mutations that occur in different tissues and at different periods of development. If a mutation happens in the non-gamete forming tissues, it is characterized as somatic. Germline mutations occur in the egg or sperm cells and can be passed on to offspring. Mutations that occur early on in development will affect a greater number of cells and can result in an individual that can be identified as a mosaic strictly based on phenotype.

Mosaicism also results from a phenomenon known as X-inactivation. All female mammals have two X chromosomes. To prevent lethal gene dosage problems, one of these chromosomes is inactivated following fertilization. This process occurs randomly for all of the cells in the organism's body. Because a given female's two X chromosomes will almost certainly differ in their specific pattern of alleles, this will result in differing cell phenotypes depending on which chromosome is silenced. Calico cats, which are almost all female, demonstrate one of the most commonly observed manifestations of this process.

=== Trinucleotide repeat disorders ===
Trinucleotide repeat disorders also follow a non-Mendelian pattern of inheritance. These diseases are all caused by the expansion of microsatellite tandem repeats consisting of a stretch of three nucleotides. Typically in individuals, the number of repeated units is relatively low. With each successive generation, there is a chance that the number of repeats will expand. As this occurs, progeny can progress to premutation and ultimately affected status. Individuals with a number of repeats that falls in the premutation range have a good chance of having affected children. Those who progress to affected status will exhibit symptoms of their particular disease. Prominent trinucleotide repeat disorders include Fragile X syndrome and Huntington's disease. In the case of Fragile X syndrome it is thought that the symptoms result from the increased methylation and accompanying reduced expression of the fragile X intellectual disability gene in individuals with a sufficient number of repeats.

== See also ==
- Meiotic drive
- CoRR hypothesis
- Epigenetic inheritance
- Gene drive
- Intragenomic conflict
- Mendelian inheritance
- Online Mendelian Inheritance in Man
- Online Mendelian Inheritance in Animals
