= Charles W. Metz =

American geneticist

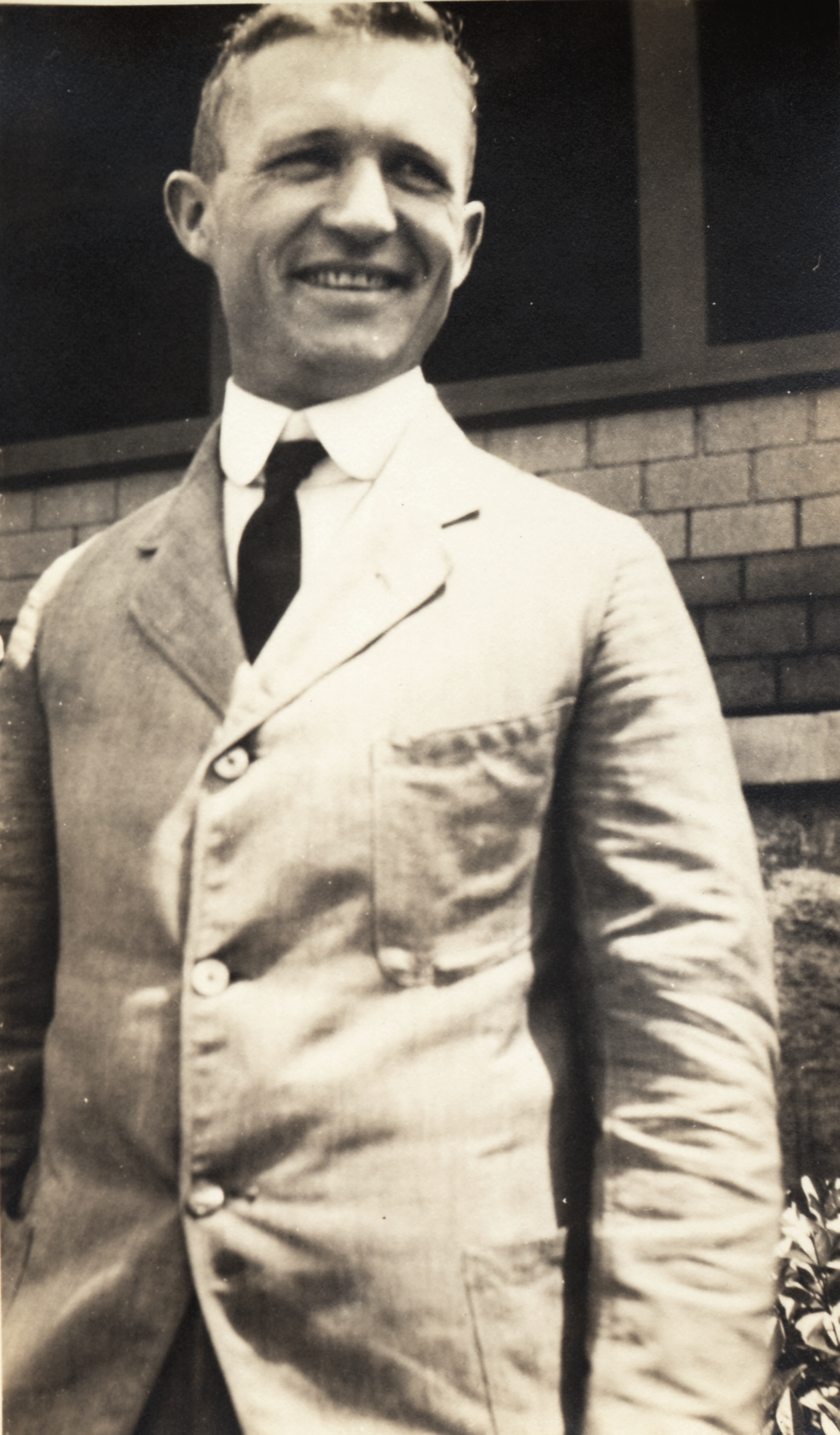
- Metz at the Marine Biological Laboratory, Woods Hole (c. 1920s)
- Born: Charles William Metz; February 17, 1889; Sheridan, Wyoming, United States
- Died: February 25, 1975 (aged 86); United States
- Education: Columbia University
- Known for: Studies of chromosome behavior in Sciara (Bradysia), including non-random chromosome segregation and chromosome elimination
- Awards: National Academy of Sciences (1948)
- Scientific career
- Fields: Genetics, Cytogenetics
- Workplaces: University of Pennsylvania; Johns Hopkins University; Carnegie Institution of Washington
- Doctoral advisor: Thomas Hunt Morgan

Charles William Metz (February 17, 1889 – February 25, 1975) was an American geneticist known for his work on chromosome behavior and non-Mendelian inheritance, particularly in the fungus gnat Bradysia (formerly Sciara). He was among the early generation of geneticists trained in the school of Thomas Hunt Morgan and contributed to the cytogenetic analysis of chromosome segregation and sex determination.

== Early life and education ==
Metz earned his Ph.D. in 1916 in the laboratory of Thomas Hunt Morgan at Columbia University, where he initially worked on Drosophila genetics.

Metz grew up in Wyoming, where his family was established in the region; his brother, Percy W. Metz, later became a lawyer and judge associated with the prosecution of the Spring Creek Raid.

== Career ==
Following his doctoral work, Metz was associated with the Carnegie Institution of Washington, including its Department of Genetics at Cold Spring Harbor Laboratory. He later held academic positions at Johns Hopkins University and the University of Pennsylvania, where he served as professor and chair of zoology and directed the zoological laboratory.

Metz was elected to the United States National Academy of Sciences in 1948.

== Research ==
Metz’s early work was in Drosophila genetics, but he soon shifted to the fungus gnat Bradysia (Sciara), which became his primary model system. He established laboratory stocks of this organism and studied it throughout his career.

Metz discovered that chromosomes in male meiosis of Bradysia undergo non-random segregation, in contrast to the expectations of Mendelian inheritance. His work demonstrated that paternal chromosomes are selectively eliminated during spermatogenesis, while maternal chromosomes are retained, providing an early example of what is now termed genomic imprinting. As summarized in later reviews, this system represented one of the first clear cases of non-random chromosome segregation and paternal genome elimination.

He also described unusual features of meiosis in Bradysia, including a monopolar spindle in the first meiotic division and atypical segregation of sex chromosomes. These studies contributed to understanding chromosome behavior, sex determination, and deviations from classical Mendelian inheritance.

Metz also investigated sex determination mechanisms in Bradysia, showing that sex is determined by the maternal genotype and involves selective elimination of X chromosomes during early embryogenesis.

== Personal life ==
Metz was married to Blanche Stafford Metz. They had at least three children, including biologist Charles Baker Metz, who worked in fertilization and reproductive biology, Alburn Stafford Metz,, and Jane Metz, who married molecular biologist Emile Zuckerkandl.

== Selected publications ==
- Metz, C. W. (1926). "An apparent case of monocentric mitosis in Sciara (Diptera)". Science. 63 (1624): 190–191. doi:10.1126/science.63.1624.190. PMID 17836446.
- Metz, C. W. (1925). "Chromosomes and sex in Sciara". Science. 61 (1573): 212–214. doi:10.1126/science.61.1573.212. PMID 17800329.
- Metz, C. W.; Ullian, S. S. (1929). "Genetic identification of the sex chromosomes in Sciara (Diptera)". Proceedings of the National Academy of Sciences of the United States of America. 15 (2): 82–85. doi:10.1073/pnas.15.2.82. PMC 522409. PMID 16587462.
- Metz, C. W. (1947). "Duplication of chromosome parts as a factor in evolution". The American Naturalist. 81 (797): 81–103. doi:10.1086/281505. PMID 20297034.
