= Rhynchomesostoma =

Scientific classification
- Kingdom: Animalia
- Phylum: Platyhelminthes
- Order: Rhabdocoela
- Family: Typhloplanidae
- Genus: Rhynchomesostoma; Luther, 1904

Genus of flatworms

Rhynchomesostoma is a genus of rhabdocoel flatworms in the family Typhloplanidae.

== Species ==
- Rhynchomesostoma inaliensis Norena-Janssen, 1995
- Rhynchomesostoma lutheri Papi, 1963
- Rhynchomesostoma rostratum (Müller OF, 1773)
