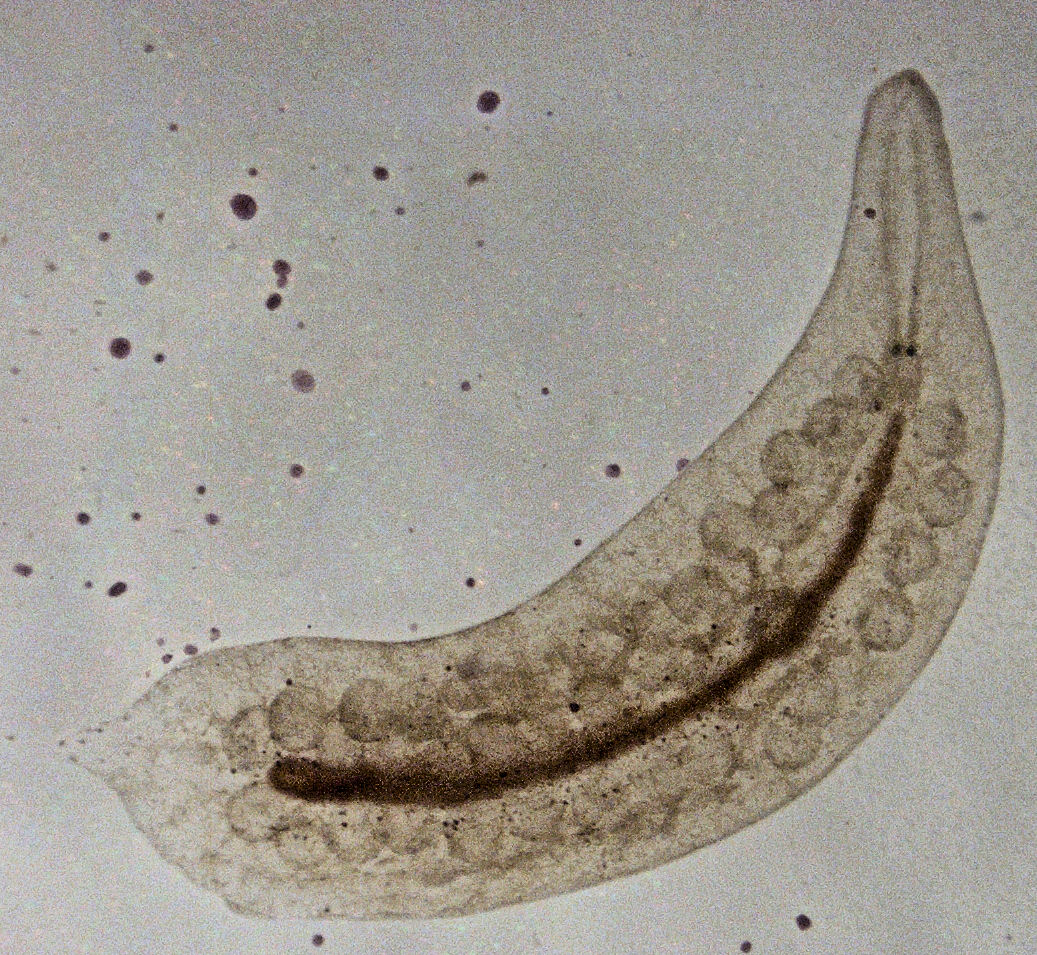
- Live Mesostoma ehrenbergii

Scientific classification
- Kingdom: Animalia
- Phylum: Platyhelminthes
- Order: Rhabdocoela
- Family: Typhloplanidae
- Genus: Mesostoma; Ehrenberg, 1837

= Mesostoma =

Genus of flatworms

Mesostoma is a genus of flatworms in the family Typhloplanidae.

The genus was described in 1837 by Christian Gottfried Ehrenberg.

Synonym: Schizostomum Schmidt, 1848 (nomen oblitum).

Species:

- Mesostoma ehrenbergii
- Mesostoma tetragonum
