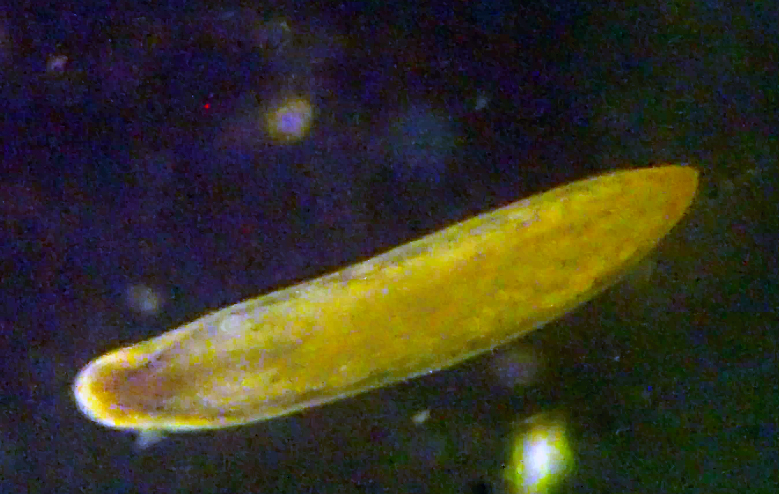

Scientific classification
- Kingdom: Animalia
- Phylum: Platyhelminthes
- Order: Rhabdocoela
- Family: Typhloplanidae
- Genus: Bothromesostoma; Braun, 1885

= Bothromesostoma =

Genus of worms

Bothromesostoma is a genus of flatworms belonging to the family Typhloplanidae.

The species of this genus are found in Europe.

Species:

- Bothromesostoma essenii Braun, 1885
- Bothromesostoma evelinae Marcus, 1946
- Bothromesostoma personatum Schmidt, 1848
