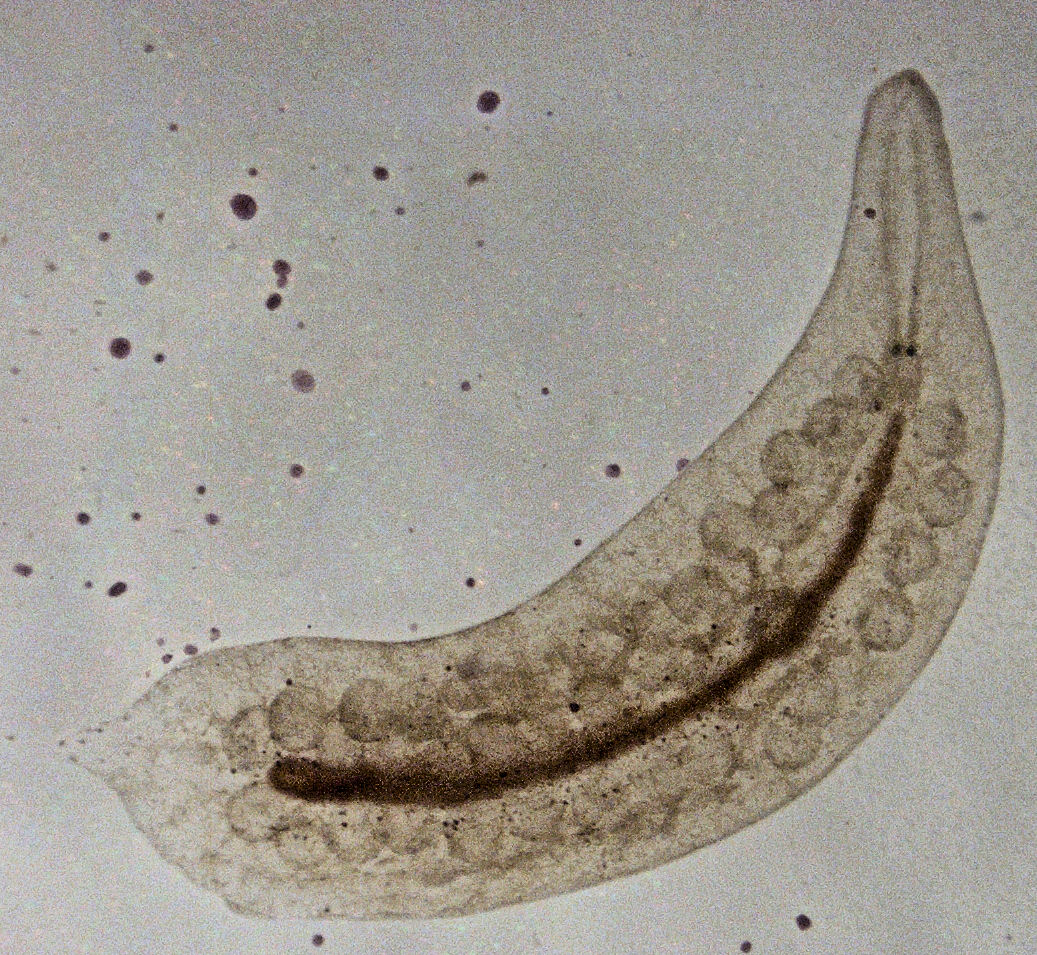
- Live specimen

Scientific classification
- Kingdom: Animalia
- Phylum: Platyhelminthes
- Order: Rhabdocoela
- Family: Typhloplanidae
- Genus: Mesostoma
- Species: M. ehrenbergii

Binomial name
- Mesostoma ehrenbergii (Focke, 1836)

= Mesostoma ehrenbergii =

Species of flatworms

Mesostoma ehrenbergii is a species of rhabdocoel flatworms in the family Typhloplanidae.

== Description ==
The species is comparatively large for microturbellarians, reaching 1,5 cm in body length. Its body is highly transparent. It is dorsoventrally flattened with the anterior end gradually tapering and broadly pointed, and the posterior end sharply pointed.

== Taxonomy ==
It was described by Gustav Woldemar Focke as Planaria ehrenbergii in 1836. The specific name references Christian Gottfried Ehrenberg.

== Distribution and habitat ==
The species has been recorded in Argentina, Brazil, Europe, Iran, Kenya, Kyrgyzstan, New Zealand, Peru, Siberia, Trinidad, and the USA. It typically occurs in ponds and lakes.

== Ecology and behavior ==
The animal primarily feeds on cladocerans, but also on fairy shrimps, naidid oligochaetes, large rotifers and mosquito larvae. It is able to produce two types of eggs, subitaneous eggs and dormant eggs.
