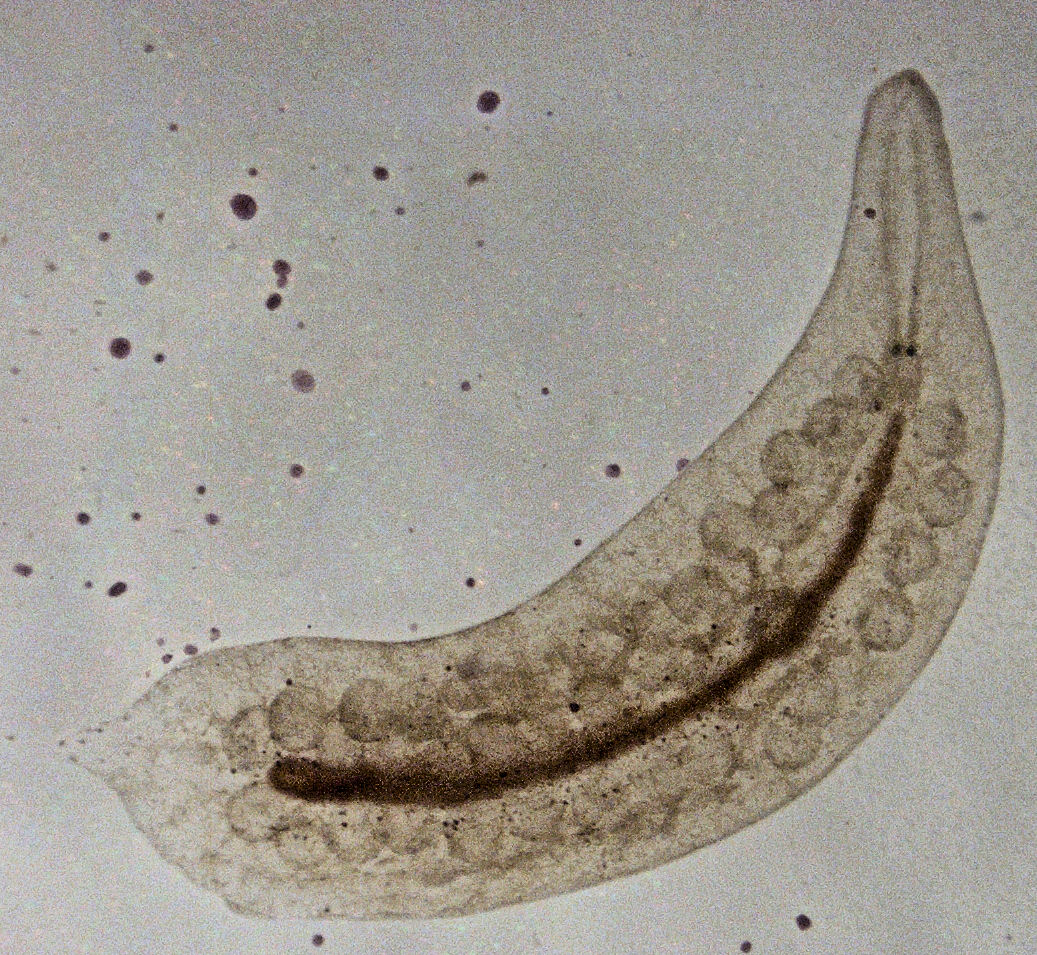
- Mesostoma ehrenbergii

Scientific classification
- Kingdom: Animalia
- Phylum: Platyhelminthes
- Order: Rhabdocoela
- Parvorder: Limnotyphloplanida
- Family: Typhloplanidae; Graff, 1905

= Typhloplanidae =

Family of flatworms

Typhloplanidae is a family of flatworms in the order Rhabdocoela.

It is one of the most species-rich families of Rhabdocoela, comprising around 300 species. They inhabit freshwater, estuarine, marine and terrestrial habitats. They can be benthic or pelagic. Typhloplanidae are predatory. They can reach high densities in their habitats. Most representatives are 1 to 5 mm in length, but a few species, like Mesostoma ehrenbergii, can reach up to 1.5 cm.

Subfamilies and genera (incomplete):

- Subfamily Ascophorinae Findenegg, 1924
- Subfamily Mesophaenocorinae Norena, Brusa, Ponce de Leon & Damborenea, 2005
- Subfamily Mesostominae Hyman, 1955
  - Genus Bothromesostoma Braun, 1885
  - Genus Mesostoma Ehrenberg, 1837
- Subfamily Olisthanellinae Luther, 1904
- Subfamily Opistominae Luther, 1963
  - Genus Opistomum Schmidt, 1848
- Subfamily Phaenocorinae Wahl, 1910
- Subfamily Protoplanellinae Reisinger, 1924
- Subfamily Rhynchomesostominae Bresslau, 1933
  - Genus Rhynchomesostoma Luther, 1904
- Subfamily Typhloplaninae Luther, 1904
