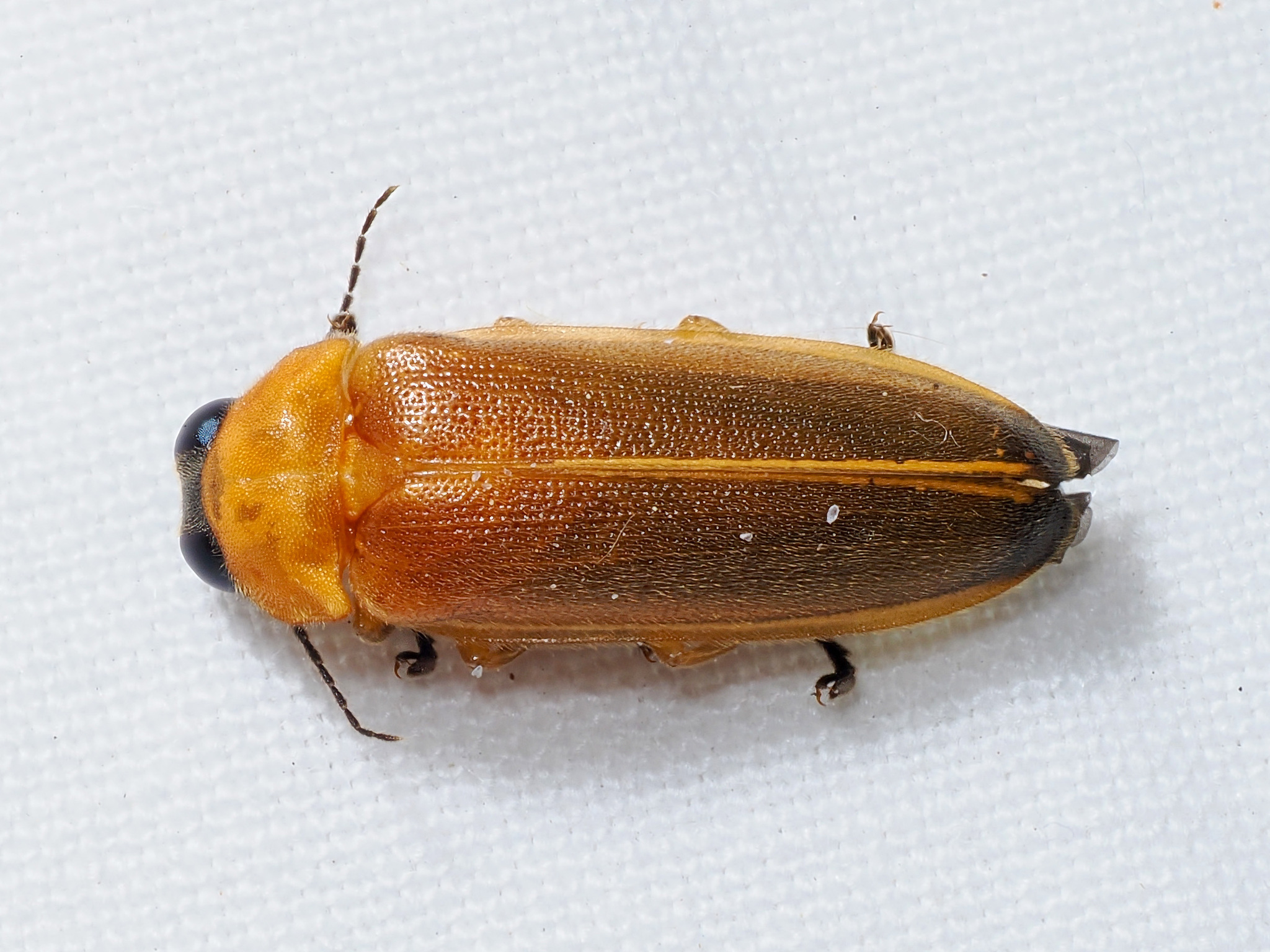
- Sclerotia fui, male, in dorsal view
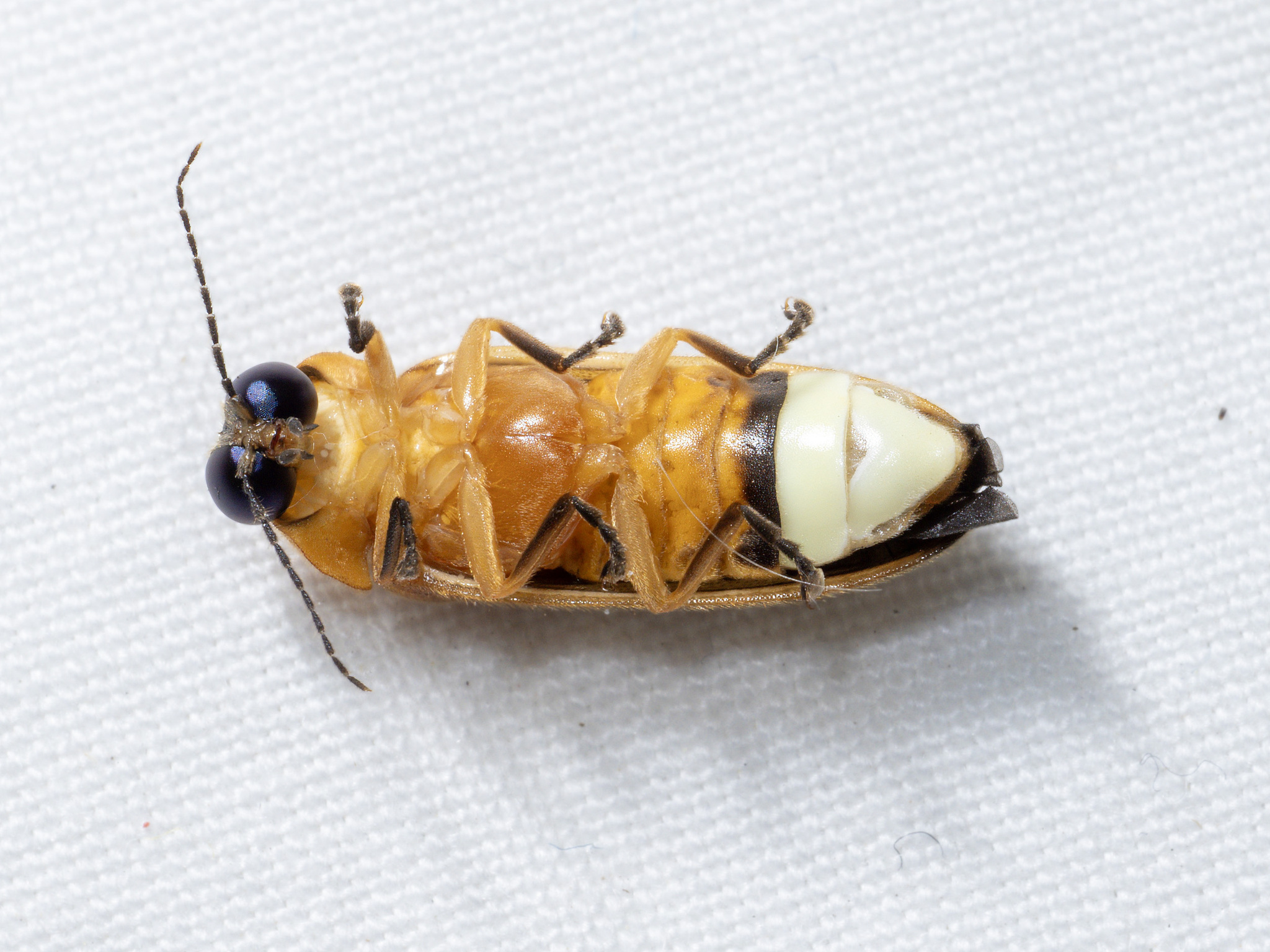
- Same specimen in ventral view

Scientific classification
- Kingdom: Animalia
- Phylum: Arthropoda
- Clade: Pancrustacea
- Class: Insecta
- Order: Coleoptera
- Suborder: Polyphaga
- Infraorder: Elateriformia
- Family: Lampyridae
- Subfamily: Luciolinae
- Genus: Sclerotia; Ballantyne, 2016

Type species
- Luciola aquatilis Thancharoen, 2007

Species
- See text

= Sclerotia (beetle) =

Genus of firefly

Sclerotia is a genus of fireflies in the subfamily Luciolinae. It contains seven species that occur in Southeast Asia. The larvae of at least three of these species are aquatic and swim on their backs.

== Taxonomy ==
The genus Sclerotia was erected in 2016 by Lesley A. Ballantyne. Seven species were assigned to the new genus, six of which have previously been classified within the genus Luciola. The seventh species, Sclerotia fui, was newly described by Ballantyne in the same contribution. Molecular evidence of three Sclerotia species indicates that they form a natural group that is distinct from other genera. The type species is Luciola aquatilis, which was described in 2007.

The seven species include:

- Sclerotia aquatilis (Thancharoen, 2007)
- Sclerotia brahmina (Bourgeois, 1890)
- Sclerotia carinata (Gorham, 1880)
- Sclerotia flavida (Hope, 1845)
- Sclerotia fui Ballantyne, 2016
- Sclerotia seriata (Olivier, 1891)
- Sclerotia substriata (Gorham, 1880)

The name Sclerotia is a Latinised form of the English word "sclerite" and points to the three sclerites that can be found around the aedeagal sheath of the male reproductive organ.

== Description and ecology ==
The identification of Luciolinae species in southeast Asia can be difficult due to similar colour patterns, with most species showing brownish or yellowish upper sides. Although Sclerotia species are no exception, they are united by distinctive internal features such as the eponymous three sclerites that surround the aedeagal sheath in the reproductive organ of the males, a unique feature within the subfamily. These sclerites are attachment sites for muscles, but their exact function in reproduction is unclear, and the mating process has not yet been observed. Sclerotia is furthermore characterised by parallel and longitudinal rows of punctures over most of the elytra (forewings). The light organ is either U or heart-shaped.

The larvae are known of three Sclerotia species; these are aquatic and swim on their backs just below the water surface. In the related genus Abscondita, in contrast, the larvae are probably terrestrial. The first and second instars might use bristles that extend sidewards as gills, while later instars lack gills. Defensive glands seem to be absent in the larvae.
