= Aquatica leii =

Scientific classification
- Kingdom: Animalia
- Phylum: Arthropoda
- Clade: Pancrustacea
- Class: Insecta
- Order: Coleoptera
- Suborder: Polyphaga
- Infraorder: Elateriformia
- Family: Lampyridae
- Genus: Aquatica
- Species: A. leii

Binomial name
- Aquatica leii (Fu & Ballantyne, 2006)

Species of beetle

Aquatica leii, also known as Lei's swamp flasher,is a species of firefly that is native to mainland China. It is one of nine species of aquatic fireflies, seven of which belong to the genus Aquatica, within the subfamily Luciolinae. The members of this genus are named for their aquatic larval stage. They have been listed as a protected species in China since June 2023. Their declining numbers are thought to be largely due to their sensitivity to water quality and pollution.

== Description ==
As larvae, A. leii are black in color with soft bodies and yellow spots. These larvae have tracheal gills and spiracles, as well as 10 pairs of eversible organs. These organs are white, forked, defensive glands that emit a "strong pine smell" when they are disturbed, most likely for defense. A. leii larvae also possess "flower-shaped" protrusions that have multiple spines on them. Adult members of this species are approximately 6.5-11mm in length and have a pale yellowish orange pronotum with a brown rim. Females are generally larger than males. Males and females produce a yellowish-greenish light as larvae and adults.

== Taxonomy ==
First mentioned under the genus Luciola in X. Fu et al's 2006 publication of The Canadian Entomologist, it was reclassified under the genus Aquatica in 2010.

== Habitat and lifecycle ==
Aquatica leii can be found in the province of Hubei in Mainland China. As larvae, they live in shallow fresh water sources such as streams, rivers, ditches, and rice fields. Larvae are unable to swim and exist as bottom dwellers, attaching themselves to substrate or hiding under sand. These larvae have the ability to glow spontaneously from light emitting organ(s) on the second to last segment of their abdomen. It is thought that this is a form of aposematism and that as adults, this ability becomes a sexual signal to aid in finding a mate. As adults both males and females retain this ability to flash from their light emitting organ, with males flying at dusk in search of females. Once a female is located, the male switches to a new "courting pattern", and the female flashes a pattern in response. Males may attempt to court the same female and it is thought that sexual selection may be based on the bases of the male flashes. After mating, females lay their eggs on the leaves and stems of aquatic plants above the water line and then die after approximately 7 days. The adult stage typically lasts around a total of 10 days for this species. The larval stage has been known to last approximately two years. When larvae reach maturity, they emerge onto land and form a "pupal cell" using soil. They remain in this cell for around 5 days before emerging as adults. Emergence occurs between the months of April and September.

== Diet ==
Aquatica leii exhibits predatory behavior and specializes on a diet of aquatic snails. Larvae typically search for food at night, and more than one individual can be seen feeding on the same snail.

== Threats ==
No species has been witnessed preying upon A.leii, but they have been witnessed becoming captured in a spider's web, with their flashes attracting other members of their species to the web as well. Due to their aquatic larval stage, they face multiple threats including, but not limited to: habitat loss (water bodies drying), water pollution, and overall declines in water quality.

== Applications for humans ==
Due to their diet of freshwater snails, it has been suggested that A. leii may be of use as a biological agent, potentially able to control the spread of parasites like liver flukes, which utilize these snails as an intermediate host and can cause schistosomiasis.
