= Aquatica hydrophila =

Scientific classification
- Kingdom: Animalia
- Phylum: Arthropoda
- Class: Insecta
- Order: Coleoptera
- Suborder: Polyphaga
- Infraorder: Elateriformia
- Family: Lampyridae
- Genus: Aquatica
- Species: A. hydrophila

Binomial name
- Aquatica hydrophila (Jeng, Lai & Yang, 2003)

Synonyms
- Luciola hydrophila Jeng, Lai & Yang, 2003

Species of beetle

Aquatica hydrophila is a species of firefly found in Taiwan. Described in 2003, it was formerly placed in the genus Luciola. The larvae are aquatic and live in ditches and small streams.

== Taxonomy ==
Jeng, Lai and Yang described this species as Luciola hydrophila in 2003. The type locality is Wulai, New Taipei, Taiwan, and the holotype is in the National Museum of Natural Science. In 2010, Fu, Ballantyne and Lambkin transferred it to the new genus Aquatica.

== Description ==
The adult male is 11–14 mm (0.43–0.55 in) long, and the female is 11–15 mm (0.43–0.59 in) long. The elongate, convex body is 4–5 mm (0.16–0.20 in) long. It is covered with golden hairs. The prothorax and scutellum are pale yellow, and the elytra are dark brown. The ventrites are dark yellow to brown. The eyes are larger in the male. The male's elongate aedeagal sheath is about 3.1 mm (0.12 in) long. Mature larvae are 19–21 mm (0.75–0.83 in) long and 5–6 mm (0.20–0.24 in) wide. They have gills, and they have glands that can be turned inside out and secrete protective substances.

== Distribution and habitat ==
A. hydrophila is found in Taiwan, below 1,000 m (3,300 ft) in elevation. It is more common in the northern and central parts of the island. Adults are mainly found from March to July. Larvae occur in ditches and small streams with fast-flowing, shallow water and cobbles at the bottom.

== Behaviour ==
The larvae are aquatic. They are unable to swim; they crawl at the bottom of water. The larvae prey on freshwater snails such as Semisulcospira libertina and Melanoides tuberculata. The adults produce green-yellow light and have been seen looking for mates near water. Artificial lights can attract males. There is probably one generation per year.
