= Aquatica ficta =

Scientific classification
- Kingdom: Animalia
- Phylum: Arthropoda
- Class: Insecta
- Order: Coleoptera
- Suborder: Polyphaga
- Infraorder: Elateriformia
- Family: Lampyridae
- Genus: Aquatica
- Species: A. ficta

Binomial name
- Aquatica ficta (Olivier, 1909)

Synonyms
- Luciola ficta Olivier, 1909

Species of beetle

Aquatica ficta is a species of firefly found in Taiwan and parts of China. It was formerly placed in the genus Luciola. Its habitat is still water, and the larvae are aquatic.

== Taxonomy ==
The species was described as Luciola ficta by Ernest Olivier in 1909. The type locality is Pin-fa, Guizhou. In 2010, Fu, Ballantyne and Lambkin transferred it and three other Luciola species to the new genus Aquatica.

== Description ==
A. ficta has an elongate-oval body that is 7–11 mm (0.28–0.43 in) long and 3–4 mm (0.12–0.16 in) wide. The male and female have the same colouration. The pronotum is orange, and the elytra are dark brown, with yellowish brown fringes. The legs have yellowish brown femora. The venter is yellowish brown and dark brown. The male has an oblong aedeagal sheath, around 2.0 mm (0.079 in) long, and elongate and subparallel genitalia. The larva has gills and glands that secrete protective substances.

== Distribution and habitat ==
A. ficta is found in Guizhou, Fujian, Hong Kong and Taiwan. It is commonly found in still water and rice paddies, and the larvae prefer muddy substrate. Adults occur all year. In Taiwan, they are most common in April and August.

== Behaviour ==
The larvae are aquatic; not being able to swim, they crawl at the bottom of water. They go through six instars. They eat small invertebrates and carrion. The larvae probably burrow in mud during dry periods. The adult's light is green-yellow. The males fly to look for mates while the females usually do not fly, remaining on the ground. About 100 eggs are laid on moist soil or plants. In one experiment, the life cycle was completed in about 120 days. A 2010 study recorded about 390 days, the larval stage spanning about 330 days.
