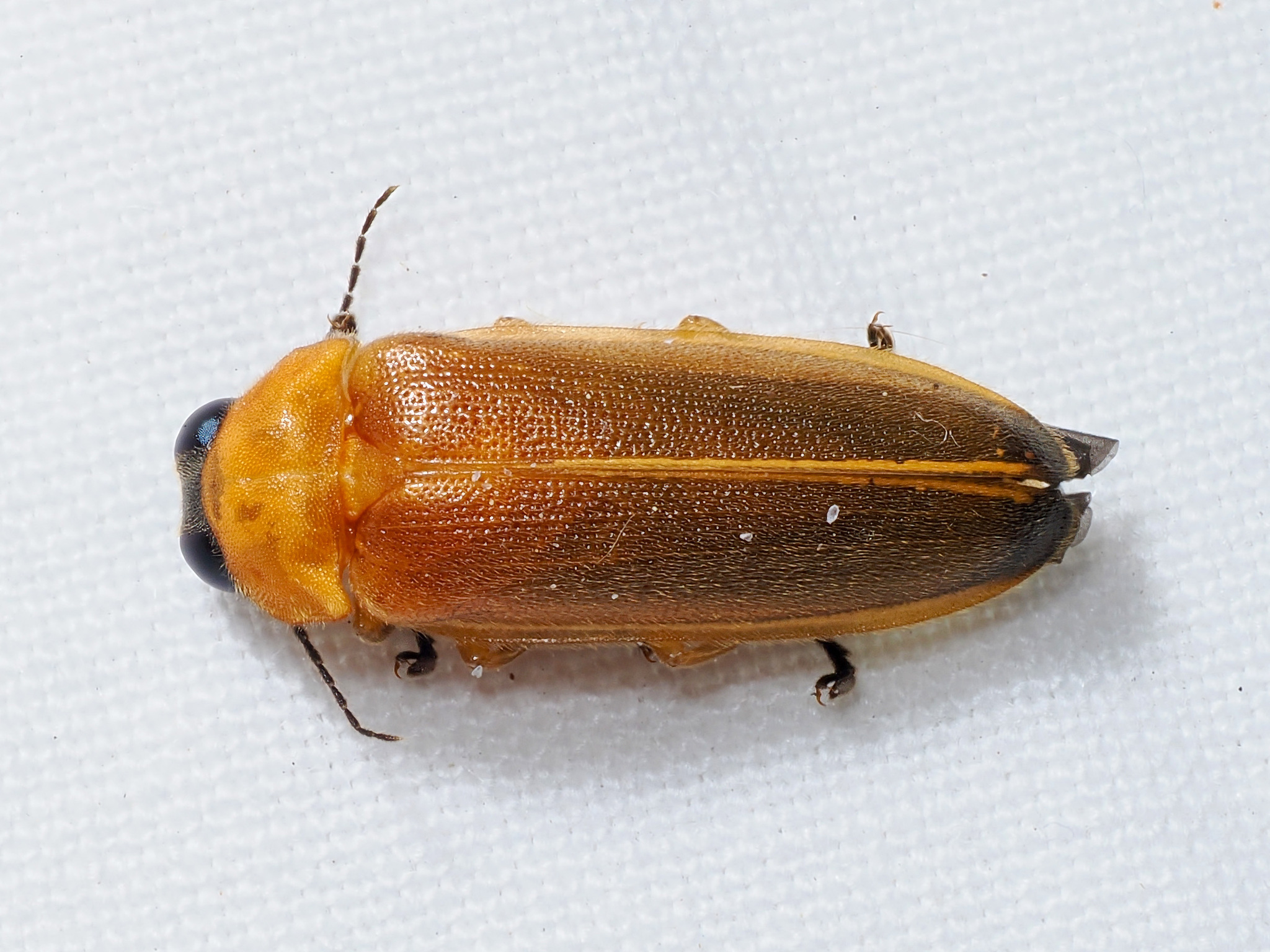
- Male specimen, dorsal view
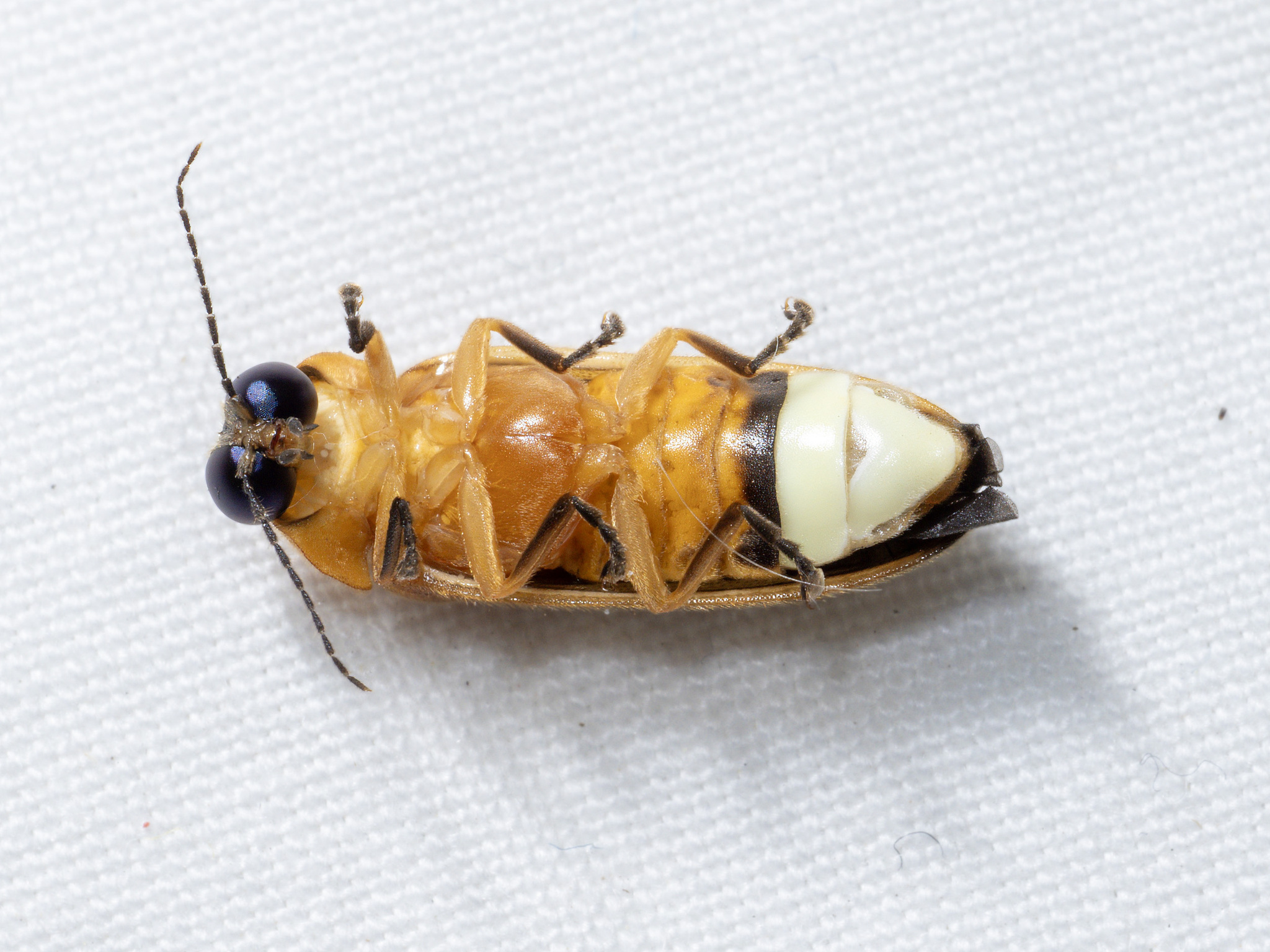
- Same specimen in ventral view

Scientific classification
- Domain: Eukaryota
- Kingdom: Animalia
- Phylum: Arthropoda
- Class: Insecta
- Order: Coleoptera
- Suborder: Polyphaga
- Infraorder: Elateriformia
- Family: Lampyridae
- Genus: Sclerotia
- Species: S. fui

Binomial name
- Sclerotia fui Ballantyne, 2016

= Sclerotia fui =

Species of firefly

Sclerotia fui is a species of firefly found in China. First described in 2016, it is one of seven species in the genus Sclerotia within the Luciolinae subfamily. The adult is less than a centimeter in length with pale-brown forewings, orange pronotum ("neck plate"), and dark-brown head. The larva is aquatic and swims on its back directly under the water surface. The species is named after the Chinese entomologist Xin Hua Fu.

== Taxonomy ==
Sclerotia fui was formally described in 2016 by Lesley A. Ballantyne. The genus Sclerotia was erected in the same paper that described S. fui; it contains six other species, all from southeastern Asia. These six species were previously classified within the genus Luciola. Sclerotia fui was described based on male and female specimens from different localities in Hubei Province and Shanghai, China; the holotype, a male, was collected in Wuhan.

The second part of the species name (fui) honors Xin Hua Fu, who was the first to observe and study this species. Fu and colleagues had reported on this species and its larva in several publications since 2005, where they misidentified it as Luciola substriata.

== Description ==
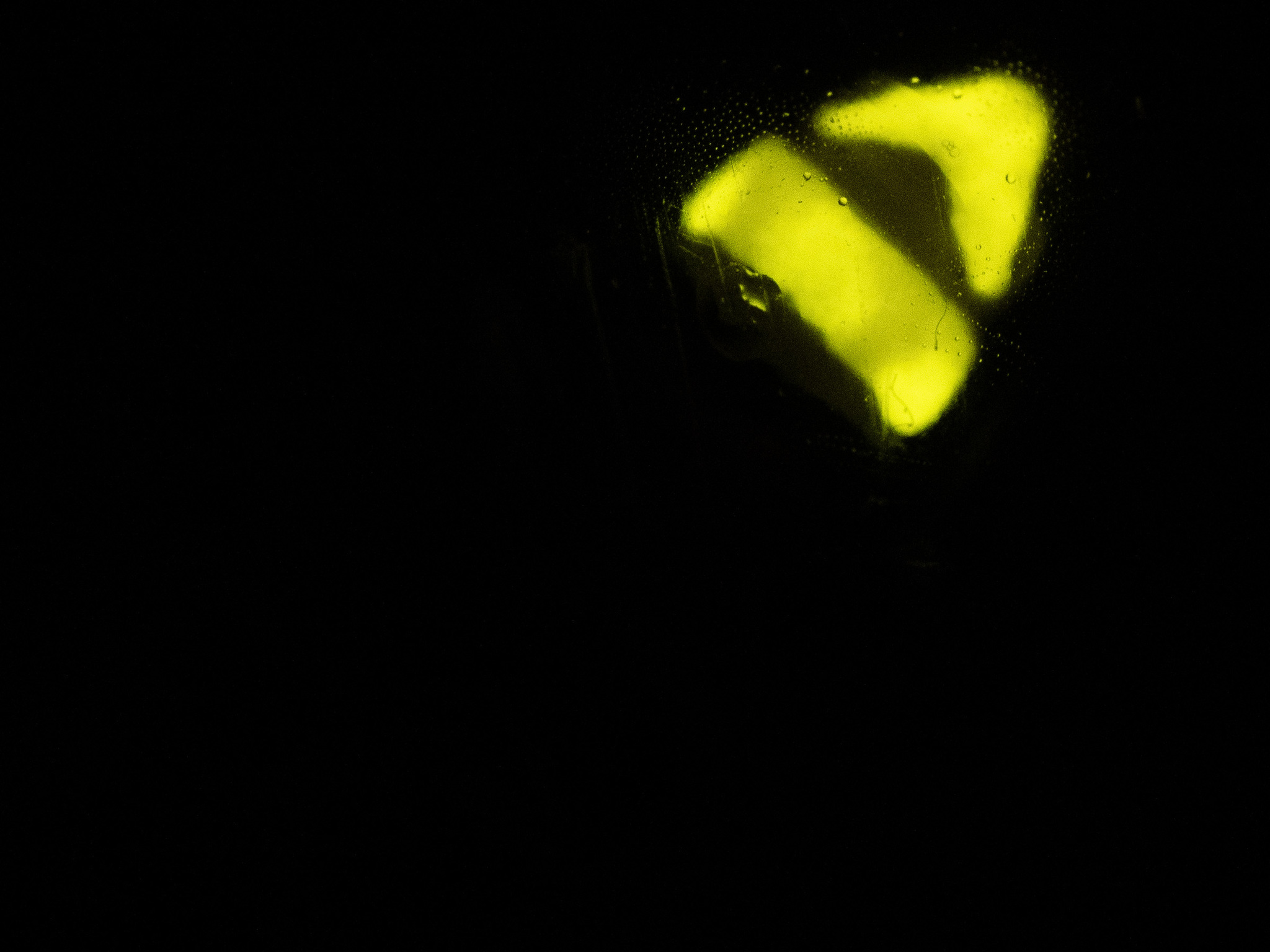
Sclerotia fui emitting light

The upper sides are pale brown, and the rear tips of the elytra (forewings) are weakly black. The pronotum (the plate between head and wings) is orange yellow, and the head is dark brown. The underside and legs are mostly yellow, with parts of the lower parts of the legs (tibiae and tarsi) being dark brown. Males measure 8.1–9.4 mm (0.32–0.37 in) in length and females measure 8.2–9.4 mm (0.32–0.37 in) in length; the width-to-length ratio is 0.4.

The pale-brown coloration of the upper side is the primary feature used to distinguish the species from the otherwise very similar Sclerotia aquatilis, the type species of Sclerotia; both species are distinct as shown by a molecular phylogenetic analysis.

== Larvae ==
As in other species of Sclerotia, the larvae are aquatic and swim on their backs just below the water surface. The first and second instars might use bristles that extend sidewards as gills, while later instars lack gills. Defensive glands seem to be absent in the larvae.

== Status ==
In June 2023, China's National Forestry and Grassland Administration included the species in its "List of Terrestrial Wild Animals of Important Ecological, Scientific and Social Value"; it is therefore recognised as being in need of protection.
