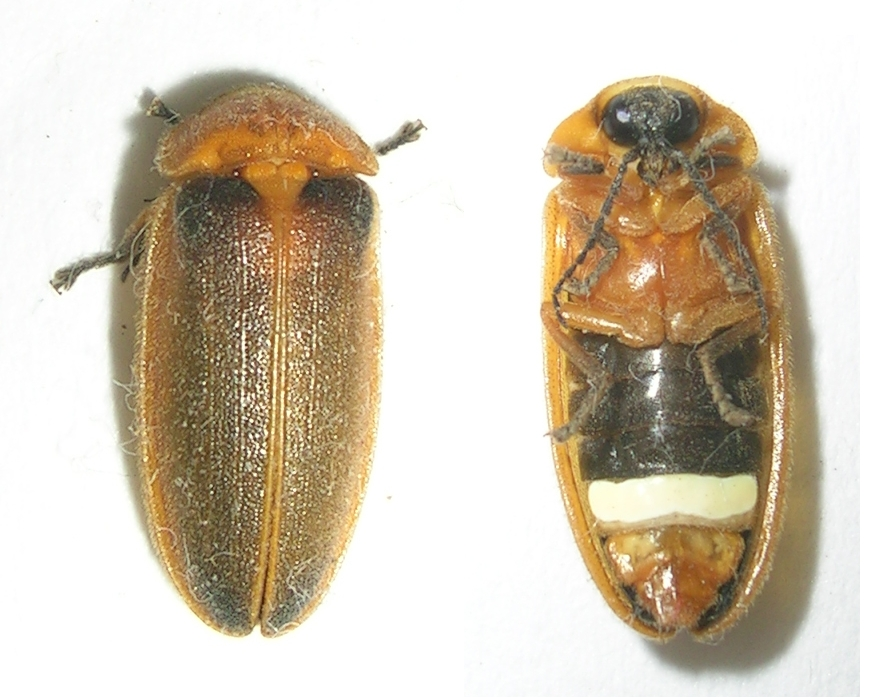
- Asymmetricata cf. humeralis

Scientific classification
- Kingdom: Animalia
- Phylum: Arthropoda
- Clade: Pancrustacea
- Class: Insecta
- Order: Coleoptera
- Suborder: Polyphaga
- Infraorder: Elateriformia
- Family: Lampyridae
- Subfamily: Luciolinae
- Genus: Asymmetricata; Ballantyne, 2009

Type species
- Luciola circumdata Motschulsky, 1854

= Asymmetricata =

Genus of beetles

Asymmetricata is a genus of fireflies found in tropical Asia. Species in the genus were formerly included in the genus Luciola. The genus was created in 2009 by Lesley Ballantyne who noted the asymmetric 8th abdominal tergite, emarginated on its left, as a shared feature. Adults of both males and females are winged. The larvae have been reliably described only in A. circumdata. They are terrestrial carnivores, feeding on snails and earthworms in moist soil below tree cover. The last abdominal segment bears an anchoring structure or pygopod with 58 or more pygopodia arising from it.

Four species are recognized:

- Asymmetricata bicoloripes (Pic, 1927)
- Asymmetricata circumdata (Motschulsky, 1854)
- Asymmetricata humeralis (Walker, 1858)
- Asymmetricata ovalis (Hope in Gray, 1831)
