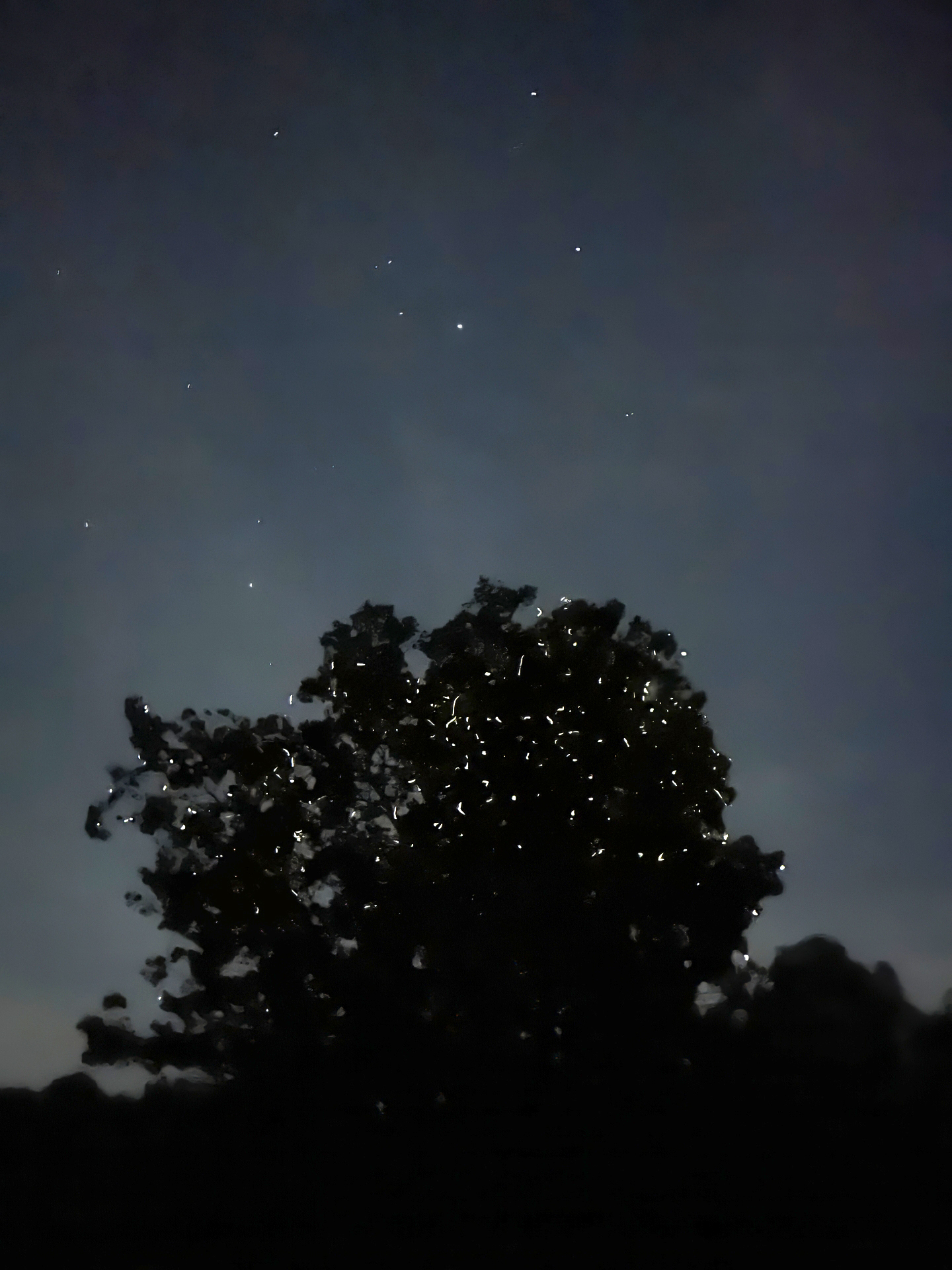
- P. mcdermotti, Bohol, Philippines
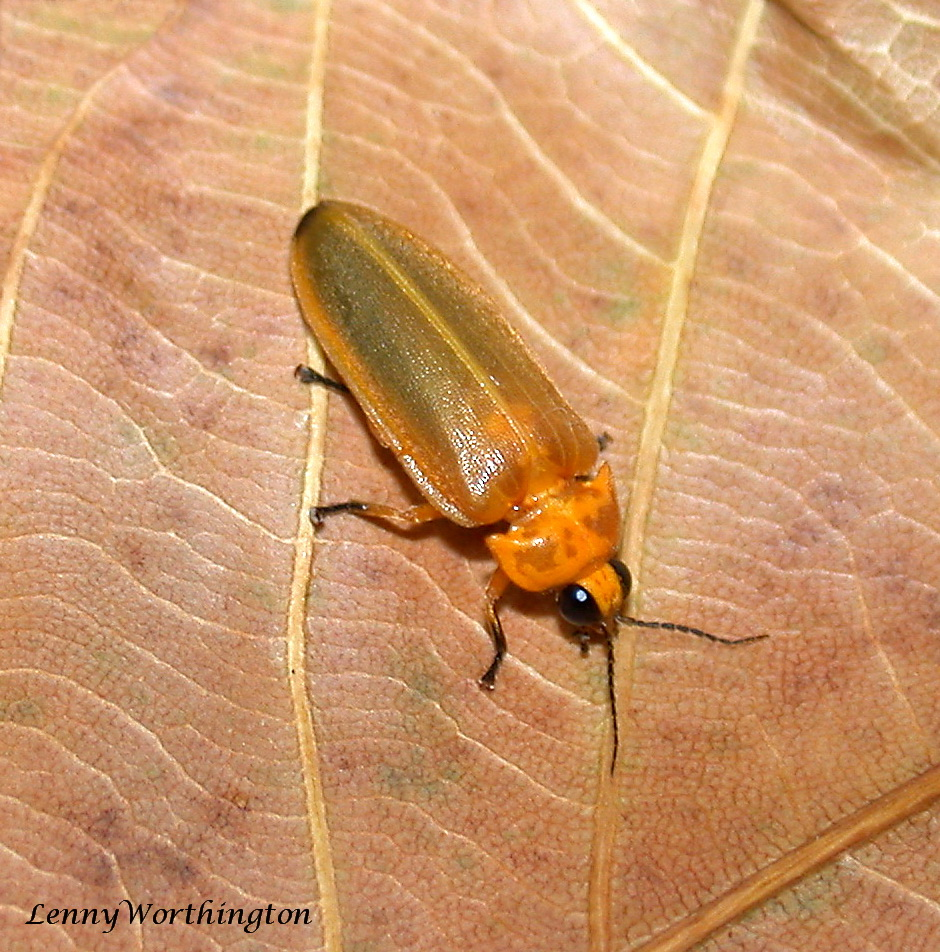
- P.x valida in Chaiyaphum, Thailand

Scientific classification
- Kingdom: Animalia
- Phylum: Arthropoda
- Clade: Pancrustacea
- Class: Insecta
- Order: Coleoptera
- Suborder: Polyphaga
- Infraorder: Elateriformia
- Family: Lampyridae
- Subfamily: Luciolinae
- Genus: Pteroptyx; Olivier, 1902

Type species
- Pteroptyx testacea (Motschulsky, 1854)

Species
- See text

= Pteroptyx =

Genus of fireflies

Pteroptyx is a genus of fireflies in the subfamily Luciolinae found in Southeast Asia. It has long been noted for the ability to perform synchronous flashing, though not all species synchronize. These synchronizing species have been found on so-called 'firefly trees' and created a growing firefly-watching tour industry in some regions. Species of the genus have been identified in Malaysia, Thailand, the Philippines, and Hong Kong.

== Identification ==
The genus Pteroptyx was first proposed by Ernest Olivier in 1902 for Luciola-like species. He identified two species, Luciola malaccae and Luciola testacea, which were later reassigned to the Pteroptyx genus. Three subsequent species, P. tener, P. bearni, and P. valida were described by Olivier between 1907 and 1909. Much of the work revising the genera within Luciolinae has been done by Australian entomologist Lesley Ballantyne, beginning in 1970.

The genus was originally defined based on characteristics of adult males: deflexed elytral apex, trisinuate ventrite 7, and a metafemoral comb. However some of the recently assigned species do not have either the deflexed elytral apex or the metafemoral comb. Developments in molecular sequencing techniques have improved the ability of entomologists to identify and delineate new species based on only female or larval specimens that were not collected in association with males. Jusoh et al. (2014) used these techniques to propose a new species, P. balingiana, as distinct from P. malaccae, but it has not been widely accepted.

== Taxonomy ==
The genus Pteroptyx was divided into Pteroptyx, Trisinuata, and Medeoptyx in 2013, with divisions based on localities and certain morphological characteristics. The genus Inflata is grouped with the three genera to form a monophyletic clade.

== Ecology ==
The males of two species, P. malaccae and P. tener, are often found in large groups on certain trees and perform synchronized flashing displays to attract females for mating. The first report of these synchronous displays was recorded in Thailand over a century ago, although the number of fireflies have decreased, likely due to the reduction of the necessary mangrove forests due to urbanization and shrimp farming in Thailand. Pollution and habitat loss have resulted in the loss of nearly all Pteroptyx populations from the area around Bangkok.

Many of the species examined by Jusoh et al. in 2018 using genetic sequencing of the mitochondrial DNA were associated with mangroves, as their larva need a continuously damp environment to develop. As a result, many of the species in the genus are at risk of habitat loss due to damage of mangroves as a result of rising sea levels from climate change.

=== Human interaction ===
Boat tours for observing the congregating, synchronous flashing of Pteroptyx species are popular in the Sundaic region of southern Thailand and Malaysia. This form of ecotourism has been used to stress the importance of mangrove protection and preservation, as many of the tour operators are local fishermen earning supplemental income. The Kampung Kuantan Firefly Park in Selangor, Malaysia received over 57,000 visitors in 2018 to observe the synchronized flashing of P. tener; the fireflies have become an importance source of tourism dollars, although their numbers are decreasing due to human development and anthropogenic impacts on and near firefly habitats.

== Species ==
As described by Ballantyne & Lambkin in 2015, there are 17 known species in Pteroptyx.

- Pteroptyx asymmetria Ballantyne, 2001
- Pteroptyx bearni Olivier, 1909
- Pteroptyx decolor Olivier, 1911
- Pteroptyx galbina Jusoh, 2015
- Pteroptyx gelasina Ballantyne, 2001
- Pteroptyx gombakia Ballantyne, 2015
- Pteroptyx maipo Ballantyne, 2011
- Pteroptyx malaccae (Gorham, 1880)
- Pteroptyx macdermotti McLean, 1970
- Pteroptyx masatakai Kawashima, 2003
- Pteroptyx sayangia Ballantyne, 2015
- Pteroptyx sulawesiensis Kawashima, 2003
- Pteroptyx surabayia Ballantyne, 2015
- Pteroptyx tener Olivier, 1907
- Pteroptyx testacea (Motschulsky, 1854)
- Pteroptyx trucata Ballantyne, 2001
- Pteroptyx valida Olivier, 1909
