= Atyphella lewisi =

Scientific classification
- Kingdom: Animalia
- Phylum: Arthropoda
- Clade: Pancrustacea
- Class: Insecta
- Order: Coleoptera
- Suborder: Polyphaga
- Infraorder: Elateriformia
- Family: Lampyridae
- Genus: Atyphella
- Species: A. lewisi

Binomial name
- Atyphella lewisi Ballantyne, 2000

Species of beetle

Atyphella lewisi is a species of firefly in the subfamily Luciolinae. It is known from Queensland, Australia.

Atyphella lewisi are small fireflies, less than 6 mm (0.24 in) in length, that have striped elytra.
