= Aquatica (beetle) =

Scientific classification
- Kingdom: Animalia
- Phylum: Arthropoda
- Clade: Pancrustacea
- Class: Insecta
- Order: Coleoptera
- Suborder: Polyphaga
- Infraorder: Elateriformia
- Family: Lampyridae
- Subfamily: Luciolinae
- Genus: Aquatica; Fu, Ballantyne & Lambkin, 2010

Type species
- Aquatica wuhana Fu, Ballantyne & Lambkin, 2010

Genus of beetles

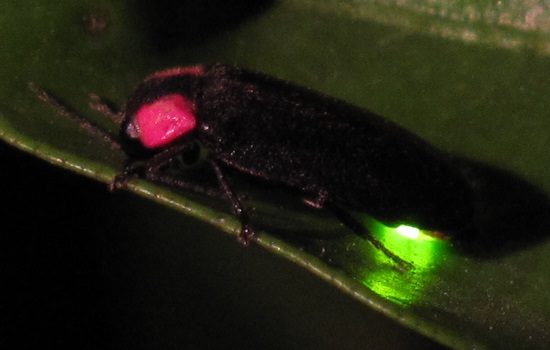
Aquatica lateralis (Japanese firefly) photographed on Mount Tsukuba, Japan

Aquatica is a genus of fireflies in the subfamily Luciolinae. The species are found in China, Taiwan, Japan, Russia and Korea. Fu, Ballantyne and Lambkin erected the genus in 2010, using phylogenetic, morphological and behavioural evidence. Its type species is Aquatica wuhana. It contains five species:

- Aquatica lateralis (Motschulsky, 1860)
- Aquatica ficta (Olivier, 1909)
- Aquatica hydrophila (Jeng et al., 2003)
- Aquatica leii (Fu & Ballantyne, 2006)
- Aquatica wuhana Fu, Ballantyne & Lambkin, 2010

All of the species except A. wuhana were previously placed in Luciola. The larvae are aquatic, and the name is derived from the English word "aquatic".
