= Luciola candezei =

Scientific classification
- Kingdom: Animalia
- Phylum: Arthropoda
- Class: Insecta
- Order: Coleoptera
- Suborder: Polyphaga
- Infraorder: Elateriformia
- Family: Lampyridae
- Subfamily: Luciolinae
- Genus: Luciola
- Species: L. candezei

Binomial name
- Luciola candezei E.Olivier, 1902

Species of beetle

Luciola candezei, is a species of firefly beetle found in Sri Lanka.
