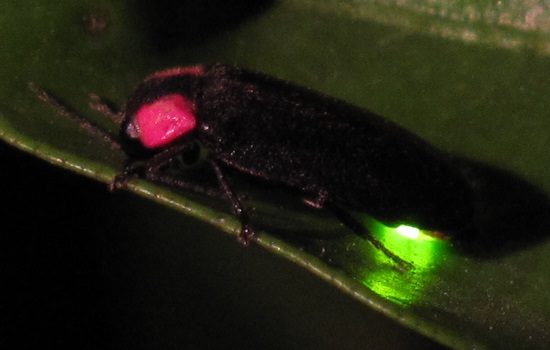

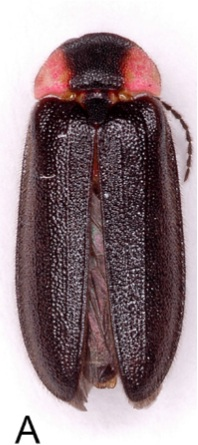

Scientific classification
- Kingdom: Animalia
- Phylum: Arthropoda
- Clade: Pancrustacea
- Class: Insecta
- Order: Coleoptera
- Suborder: Polyphaga
- Infraorder: Elateriformia
- Family: Lampyridae
- Genus: Aquatica
- Species: A. lateralis

Binomial name
- Aquatica lateralis (Motschulsky, 1860)

Synonyms
- Luciola lateralis Motschulsky, 1860

= Aquatica lateralis =

Species of insect of the genus Luciola

Aquatica lateralis, known as "heike-botaru" (ヘイケボタル) in Japanese, is a species of firefly found in Russia, Japan and Korea. It was formerly placed in the genus Luciola. The larvae are aquatic and live in rice paddies.

The genome of Aquatica lateralis was sequenced in 2018.

== Taxonomy ==
Victor Motschulsky described this species as Luciola lateralis from Dauria, Siberia in 1860. In 2010, Fu, Ballantyne and Lambkin transferred four Luciola species, including lateralis, to the new genus Aquatica. The Japanese name of A. lateralis is "heike-botaru", which may derive from The Tale of Heike, a 14th-century Japanese novel, or the Heike clan, which lost the 12th-century Genpei War. (Another, larger firefly species, Luciola cruciata, has the Japanese common name "genji-botaru", a possible reference to the Genji clan, the winners in the Genpei War).

== Description ==
The male is 6.5–9.5 mm (0.26–0.37 in) long and 2.3–3.3 mm (0.091–0.130 in) wide. The female is 7.5–10.5 mm (0.30–0.41 in) long and 2.5–3.5 mm (0.098–0.138 in) wide. The body is elongate oval. The pronotum is reddish pink or yellowish, with a central brown band, and the elytra are dark brown. The male has a brown and yellow venter, and that of the female is brown, yellow and reddish pink. The oblong aedeagal sheath, about 2.3 mm (0.091 in) in length, and the male genitalia, 1.5–1.7 mm (0.059–0.067 in) long, are asymmetric. The larva is soft, having gills and defensive organs.

== Distribution and habitat ==
A. lateralis is found in eastern Siberia, the Kuril Islands, Japan (including all four main islands) and Korea. Its presence in China is unsubstantiated. Larvae live in rice paddies. Adults are found from April to November; their numbers are greatest from June to August.

== Behaviour ==
The larvae are aquatic, crawling at the bottom of the water. Third and fourth instar larvae overwinter in soils and stubble. In Hokkaido and Korea, individuals often mature in more than one year; on Honshu, Kyushu and Shikoku, individuals usually mature in less than one year. The larvae and adults emit yellowish lights, and the dim glow of the eggs and pupae is green. The male emits flashes while searching for the female, whose flashes attract the male to a leaf 5–10 centimetres (2.0–3.9 in) from it. The male then emits a twinkling flash. Flashing continues, and then they copulate. Green, yellow and red artificial flashes all attract the male. In Hokkaido, there is longer than one second between flashes. In other areas of Japan and in Korea, there is about half a second.
