= Abscondita chinensis =

Scientific classification
- Kingdom: Animalia
- Phylum: Arthropoda
- Class: Insecta
- Order: Coleoptera
- Suborder: Polyphaga
- Infraorder: Elateriformia
- Family: Lampyridae
- Genus: Abscondita
- Species: A. chinensis

Binomial name
- Abscondita chinensis (Linnaeus, 1767)

Synonyms
- Lampyris chinensis Linnaeus, 1767; Luciola chinensis (L.). Laporte, 1833; Luciola praeusta Kiesenwetter, 1874; Lampyris vespertina Fabricius, 1801; Luciola vespertina (F.). Motschulsky, 1854; Luciola affinis Gorham, 1880; Luciola gorhami Ritsema, 1883

Species of beetle

Abscondita chinensis, is a species of firefly beetle found in India, China and Sri Lanka.

== Description ==
Both males and females have pale elytra with black apices. There are black terminal abdominal tergites, and ventrite V is completely dark coloured. Male is about 5.7 to 8.3 mm in length. Pronotum orange yellow. A narrow median sulcus is reddish yellow. Elytra semi-transparent and orange yellow in color with apical dark brown area. There is a paler suture which may have underlying fat body. Head between eyes, antennae and palpi are dark brown. Ventrum and thorax orange yellow. Legs are orange yellow with brownish tips of femora. In male, the aedeagal sheath sternite terminated by apically acute and divergent lobes. Tibiae and tarsi dark brown. Abdomen orange yellow with ventral brown marking patterns. Pronotum is about 1.15 to 1.6 mm long. Female is 7.2 to 9.1 mm in length. Body color similar to that of male, but posterolateral brown markings on V5. Pronotum is 1.2 to 1.7 mm long. Antennae almost always slightly longer. Abdomen orange yellow in color with ventral brown markings.

Larvae with pale paired anterolateral areas on protergum. Larvae intermittently glowing. Larval stage consists with five instars, and they matured in less than 5 months in captivity. Final instar larvae constructed pupal cells in soil. The mean pupal period is about 7 to 8 days. Pupae were observed to emit a continuous pale luminescent glow from the entire body. The newly-emergent adults also show weak glowing from the body.

== Biology ==
It is commonly inhabited along marshy areas, freshwater canals, paddy fields and shrubs. Mating season ranged from July to August in China. In July, first firefly flash was observed after sunset. Females, walking along the tips of grass and low vegetation on the forest floor. Both sexes emit yellowish bioluminescence. Larvae particularly active on the moist soils of the forest, preyed or scavenged on ants such as Polyrhachis vicina and other small insects.

== Molecular biology ==
In 2018, the complete mitochondrial genome sequence of the species was found. It has a circular genome of 16,309 base pairs and a base composition of A (43.63%), C (11.53%), G (8.50%), T (36.31%).
