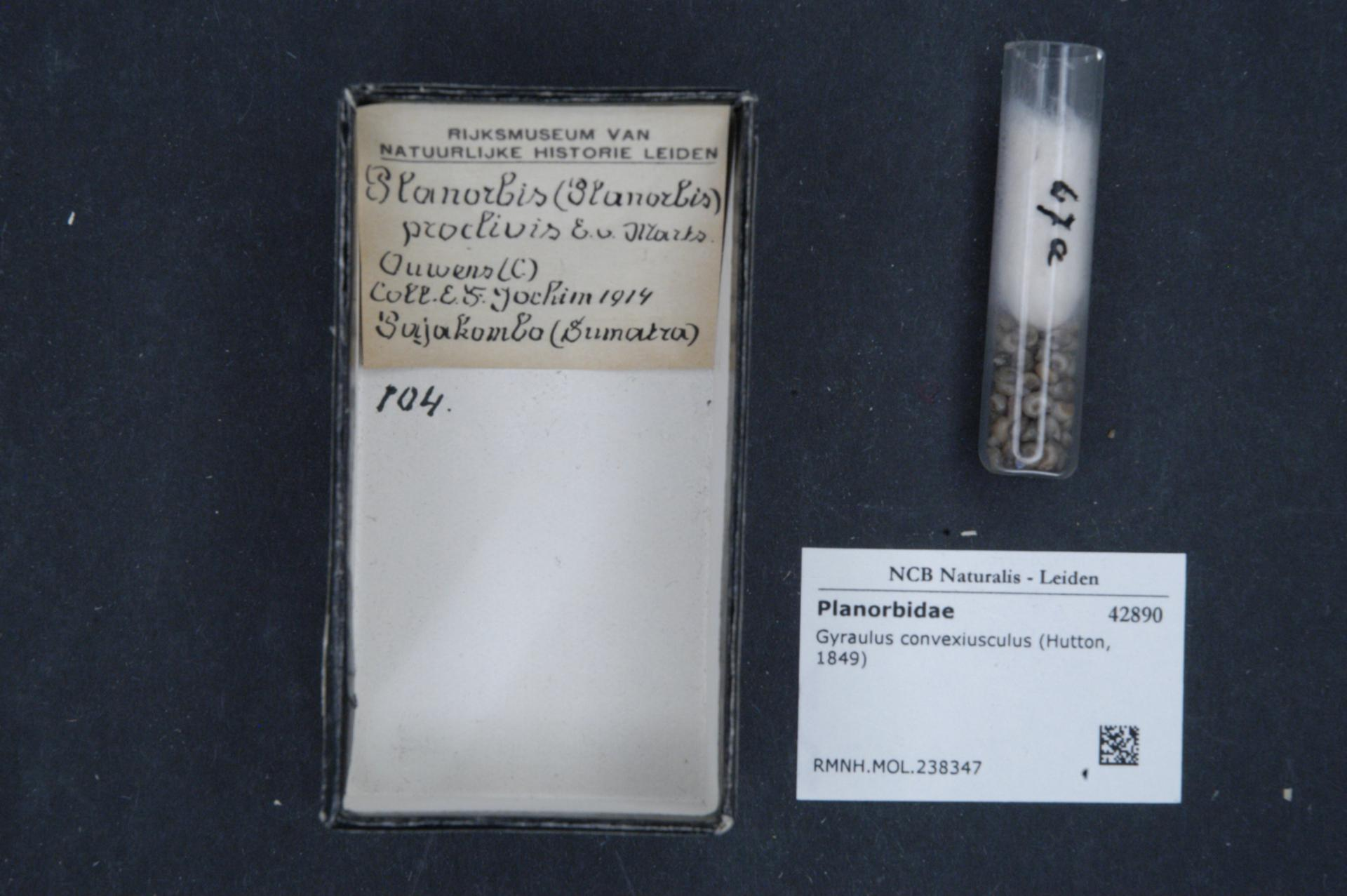
- Gyraulus convexiusculus shell

Conservation status
- Least Concern (IUCN 3.1)

Scientific classification
- Kingdom: Animalia
- Phylum: Mollusca
- Class: Gastropoda
- Superorder: Hygrophila
- Family: Planorbidae
- Genus: Gyraulus
- Species: G. convexiusculus

Binomial name
- Gyraulus convexiusculus (Hutton, 1849)

Synonyms
- Planorbis convexiusculus Hutton, 1849

= Gyraulus convexiusculus =

Species of gastropod

Gyraulus convexiusculus is a species of freshwater snail, an aquatic pulmonate gastropod mollusk in the family Planorbidae, the ram's horn snails.

== Distribution ==
Distribution of Gyraulus convexiusculus includes Sistan and Baluchestan Province and Yazd Province in Iran, Afghanistan, Thailand, Nepal, South Korea, Vietnam.

== Ecology ==
Predators of include larvae of Luciola substriata.

Gyraulus convexiusculus is the known first intermediate host of Artyfechinostomum malayanum.

Gyraulus convexiusculus is a potential first and second intermediate host of Echinostoma cinetorchis in Korea, based on laboratory work.

== Human use ==
It is a part of ornamental pet trade for freshwater aquaria.
