= Asymmetricata humeralis =

- From Bangalore

Scientific classification
- Kingdom: Animalia
- Phylum: Arthropoda
- Class: Insecta
- Order: Coleoptera
- Suborder: Polyphaga
- Infraorder: Elateriformia
- Family: Lampyridae
- Genus: Asymmetricata
- Species: A. humeralis

Binomial name
- Asymmetricata humeralis Ho, 2019

Synonyms
- Asymmetricata humeralis (Walker 1858); Colophotia humeralis Walker 1858; Luciola humeralis (Walker). Olivier 1902; Luciola doriae Olivier 1885; Luciola notatipennis Olivier 1909

Species of beetle

Asymmetricata humeralis is a species of firefly found in India and Sri Lanka.
