= Atyphella ellioti =

Scientific classification
- Domain: Eukaryota
- Kingdom: Animalia
- Phylum: Arthropoda
- Class: Insecta
- Order: Coleoptera
- Suborder: Polyphaga
- Infraorder: Elateriformia
- Family: Lampyridae
- Genus: Atyphella
- Species: A. ellioti

Binomial name
- Atyphella ellioti Ballantyne, 2000

Species of beetle

Atyphella ellioti is a species of firefly in the genus Atyphella. It is native to Australia.
