= Abscondita promelaena =

Scientific classification
- Kingdom: Animalia
- Phylum: Arthropoda
- Class: Insecta
- Order: Coleoptera
- Suborder: Polyphaga
- Infraorder: Elateriformia
- Family: Lampyridae
- Genus: Abscondita
- Species: A. promelaena

Binomial name
- Abscondita promelaena (Walker, 1858)

Synonyms
- Luciola promelaena Walker, 1858; Luciola aegrota Olivier, 1891; Luciola aegrota var. scutellaris Olivier, 1891; Luciola melaspis Bourgeois, 1909

Species of beetle

Abscondita promelaena is a species of firefly beetle found in India and Sri Lanka.
