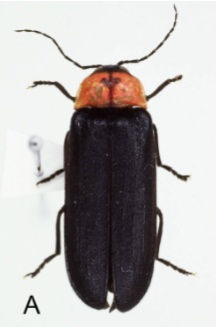
- Nipponoluciola cruciata

Scientific classification
- Kingdom: Animalia
- Phylum: Arthropoda
- Class: Insecta
- Order: Coleoptera
- Suborder: Polyphaga
- Infraorder: Elateriformia
- Family: Lampyridae
- Subfamily: Luciolinae
- Genus: Nipponoluciola; Ballantyne, Kawashima, Jusoh & Suzuki, 2022

Species
- See text

= Nipponoluciola =

Genus of firefly

Nipponoluciola is a genus of fireflies in the subfamily Luciolinae.

== Species ==
- Nipponoluciola cruciata (Motschulsky, 1854)
- Nipponoluciola owadai (Satô & Kimura, 1994)
