= Luciola antennalis =

Scientific classification
- Kingdom: Animalia
- Phylum: Arthropoda
- Class: Insecta
- Order: Coleoptera
- Suborder: Polyphaga
- Infraorder: Elateriformia
- Family: Lampyridae
- Genus: Luciola
- Species: L. antennalis

Binomial name
- Luciola antennalis Bourgeois, 1905

Species of beetle

Luciola antennalis is a species of firefly beetle found in Sri Lanka.

Dorsal surface yellow with 4 to 7 depressed antennal segments.
