= Luciola intricata =

Scientific classification
- Kingdom: Animalia
- Phylum: Arthropoda
- Class: Insecta
- Order: Coleoptera
- Suborder: Polyphaga
- Infraorder: Elateriformia
- Family: Lampyridae
- Genus: Luciola
- Species: L. intricata

Binomial name
- Luciola intricata (Walker, 1858)

Synonyms
- Colophotia intricata Walker 1858

Species of beetle

Luciola intricata is a species of firefly beetle found in Sri Lanka.

Body is about 6.1 mm long.
