= Atyphella dalmatia =

Scientific classification
- Domain: Eukaryota
- Kingdom: Animalia
- Phylum: Arthropoda
- Class: Insecta
- Order: Coleoptera
- Suborder: Polyphaga
- Infraorder: Elateriformia
- Family: Lampyridae
- Genus: Atyphella
- Species: A. dalmatia

Binomial name
- Atyphella dalmatia Ballantyne & Lambkin, 2009

Species of beetle

Atyphella dalmatia is a species of firefly in the genus Atyphella. It was discovered in 2009.
