= Luciola novaki =

Conservation status
- Endangered (IUCN 3.1)

Scientific classification
- Kingdom: Animalia
- Phylum: Arthropoda
- Class: Insecta
- Order: Coleoptera
- Suborder: Polyphaga
- Infraorder: Elateriformia
- Family: Lampyridae
- Genus: Luciola
- Species: L. novaki

Binomial name
- Luciola novaki Müller, 1946
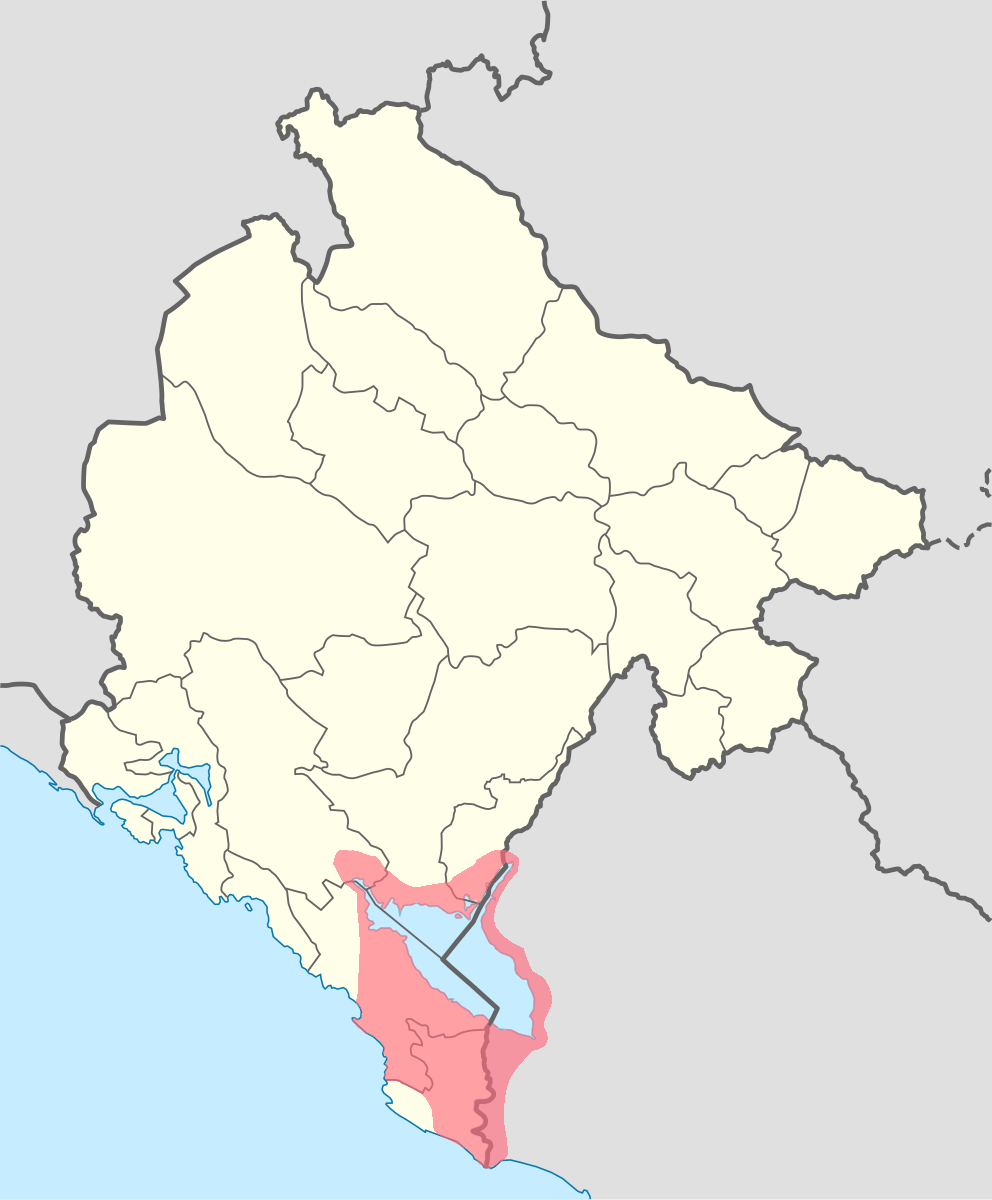
- Luciola novaki range map

Species of beetle

Luciola novaki, also known as Skadar Lake firefly, is a species of firefly beetle found in Montenegro and Albania.

== Distribution ==
Luciola novaki is likely endemic to the Lake Skadar basin, specifically its tributaries like the Bojana River and Rijeka Crnojevića. While its range extends slightly into Albania around the lake, it is almost entirely restricted to Montenegro.

Luciola novaki inhabits a range of mesic and wetland environments. It is typically found in very moist habitats, including seasonal wetlands, flooded pastures, freshwater and saline marshes, reed beds, and estuarine marshes.

== Mating behaviour ==
Luciola novaki has a short, early mating season compared to its congeners, typically lasting from late April to mid-May, with peak activity observed around May 11th.

Adults are crepuscular to nocturnal. Courtship begins at dusk (around 8:00 PM) and male flight activity ceases completely by 1:30 AM.

Male behavior: Males fly low over the wet parts of their habitat, emitting characteristic flash signals. Courtship displays often involve intense intrasexual competition, leading to the formation of chaotic clusters and "stacks" of males as multiple individuals attempt to mate with a single responding female.

Female behavior: Females are typically sedentary during courtship, positioning themselves on prominent perches such as grass stalks. In response to a flying male's signal, a receptive female will reply with a very bright, long flash lasting 1–2 seconds to advertise her location.
