= Atyphella scabra =

Scientific classification
- Domain: Eukaryota
- Kingdom: Animalia
- Phylum: Arthropoda
- Class: Insecta
- Order: Coleoptera
- Suborder: Polyphaga
- Infraorder: Elateriformia
- Family: Lampyridae
- Genus: Atyphella
- Species: A. scabra

Binomial name
- Atyphella scabra Olivier, 1911

Species of beetle

Atyphella scabra is a species of firefly in the genus Atyphella.
