= Artyfechinostomum malayanum =

Scientific classification
- Kingdom: Animalia
- Phylum: Platyhelminthes
- Class: Trematoda
- Order: Plagiorchiida
- Family: Echinostomatidae
- Genus: Artyfechinostomum
- Species: A. malayanum

Binomial name
- Artyfechinostomum malayanum (Leiper, 1911) Mendheim, 1943

Synonyms
- Echinostoma malayanum Leiper, 1911; Euparyphium malayanum Odhner, 1913; Artyfechinostomum sufrartyfex Lane, 1915; Artyfechinostomum mehrai Faruqui, 1930; Paryphostomum sufrartyfex Bhalerao, 1931; Isthmiophora malayana

Species of fluke

Artyfechinostomum malayanum is a species of digenetic trematode in the family Echinostomatidae.

The known first intermediate host of Artyfechinostomum malayanum include freshwater snails Indoplanorbis exustus and Gyraulus convexiusculus.

The ceraciae can also infect gastropods Pila scutata, Lymnaea cumingiana and Digoniostoma pulchella.
