= Luciola substriata =

Scientific classification
- Kingdom: Animalia
- Phylum: Arthropoda
- Clade: Pancrustacea
- Class: Insecta
- Order: Coleoptera
- Suborder: Polyphaga
- Infraorder: Elateriformia
- Family: Lampyridae
- Genus: Luciola
- Species: L. substriata

Binomial name
- Luciola substriata Gorham, 1880

Synonyms
- Luciola formosana Pic, 1916

Species of beetle

Luciola substriata is a species of firefly found in India, Myanmar, China and Taiwan. The larvae are aquatic and can swim, living in marshes, paddies, lakes and ponds.

== Taxonomy ==
This species was described by Henry Stephen Gorham in 1880, the type locality being Bombay (Mumbai). Luciola formosana, described by Maurice Pic in 1916, is a synonym.

== Description ==
The male is 9.5–10.5 mm (0.37–0.41 in) long and 3.5–3.8 mm (0.14–0.15 in) wide; the female is 10.5–11.5 mm (0.41–0.45 in) long and 4.0–4.2 mm (0.16–0.17 in) wide. The body is yellowish orange, and the elytra have light yellow edges. The head, eyes, antennae, tibiae and tarsi are dark brown. The luminous organ is waxy white, and that of the male is V-shaped. Mature larvae are slender, about 20 mm (0.79 in) long. They are brown, with a hard cuticle.

== Distribution and habitat ==
Luciola substriata is found in India, Myanmar, China and Taiwan. The larvae live in marshes, paddy fields, and lakes and ponds with aquatic plants. In Taiwan, they are found below 500 m (1,600 ft) in elevation. Adults are found from April to December, but they are rare near the end of the year.

== Behaviour and ecology ==
The larvae are aquatic. The first and second instar larvae probably breathe using both gills and spiracles. They mainly crawl on substrates and sometimes back swim. The third to sixth instars do not have gills and use their spiracles to breathe. They back swim, meaning that they swim upside down. Some segments of the abdomen are exposed to the air while swimming, probably in order to breathe. They also crawl on leaves. Larvae eat aquatic snails such as Stenothyra formosana, Gyraulus spirillus, Gyraulus convexiusculus and Lymnaea stagnalis. Predators of the larvae include the red swamp crayfish, Chinese mitten crab and grass carp. In Hubei, larvae overwinter at the bottom of the water. The pupae, about 9.6 mm (0.38 in) long, are light yellow, with some parts beginning to darken after three days. The pupae are enclosed in pupal cells made of earth. Adults live for about nine days, consuming only water. Mating takes several hours, after which the males quickly die. The eggs, orange-yellow in colour, are laid in masses on plants slightly below the water surface. Larvae emerge after about eleven days.
