= Atyphella =

Scientific classification
- Domain: Eukaryota
- Kingdom: Animalia
- Phylum: Arthropoda
- Class: Insecta
- Order: Coleoptera
- Suborder: Polyphaga
- Infraorder: Elateriformia
- Family: Lampyridae
- Subfamily: Luciolinae
- Genus: Atyphella; A. S. Olliff, 1890

Type species
- Atyphella lychnus Olliff, 1890

Genus of beetles

Atyphella is a genus of 'flashing' firefly (family Lampyridae) found in the Australasian region, particularly in the eastern and northern regions of Australia. The genus consists of 23 recognized species, 14 considered to be endemic to Australia.

== Description ==
The larval stage of Atyphella is morphologically similar to the Luciola larval stage, the key difference being that the Atyphella possess a series of flat projections on the sides of the body (known as explanate tergites).

Atyphella antennae are relatively short, shorter than the widest part of the head. This is almost unique among the genera of the subfamily Luciolinae with Bourgeoisia being the only other to feature this.

The adult Atyphella head is concealed under an extended pronotum and recessed into the prothoracic cavity. This effectively eliminates upwards vision when in flight and in a resting state. However, it has been observed that some species can extend the head beyond the pronotum in active searching when on the ground.

Other notable morphological features of the genus Atyphella include a head longer than it is wide and ventrally subcontiguous eyes.

Most Atyphella females are flightless and possess reduced elytra.

== Taxonomy ==
The taxonomic ranking of the Atyphella has been somewhat disputed. It was originally described in 1889 as a separate genus under Lampyridae. This was changed in 1964 when it was grouped under the genus Luciola as a subgenus (along with Pygoluciola). In 2000 it was again distinguished as a separate genus. This is the current accepted taxonomy, sitting as a sister group to Pygoluciola.

== Species list ==
Twenty-three species are currently recognised:

- Atyphella aphrogeneia (Ballantyne, 1979)
- Atyphella atra Lea, 1921
- Atyphella brevis Lea, 1909
- Atyphella conspicua Ballantyne, 2000
- Atyphella dalmatia Ballantyne & Lambkin, 2009
- Atyphella ellioti Ballantyne, 2000
- Atyphella flammans Olliff, 1890
- Atyphella flammulans Ballantyne, 2000
- Atyphella guerini (Ballantyne, 2000)
- Atyphella immaculata Ballantyne, 2000
- Atyphella inconspicua (Lea, 1921)
- Atyphella kirakira Ballantyne & Lambkin, 2009
- Atyphella lamingtonia Ballantyne & Lambkin, 2009
- Atyphella leucura (Olivier, 1906)
- Atyphella lewisi Ballantyne, 2000
- Atyphella lychnus Olliff, 1890
- Atyphella monteithi Ballantyne, 2000
- Atyphella olivieri Lea, 1915
- Atyphella palauensis Wittmer, 1958
- Atyphella scabra Olivier, 1911
- Atyphella scintillans Olliff, 1890
- Atyphella similis Ballantyne, 2000
- Atyphella testaceolineata Pic, 1939
