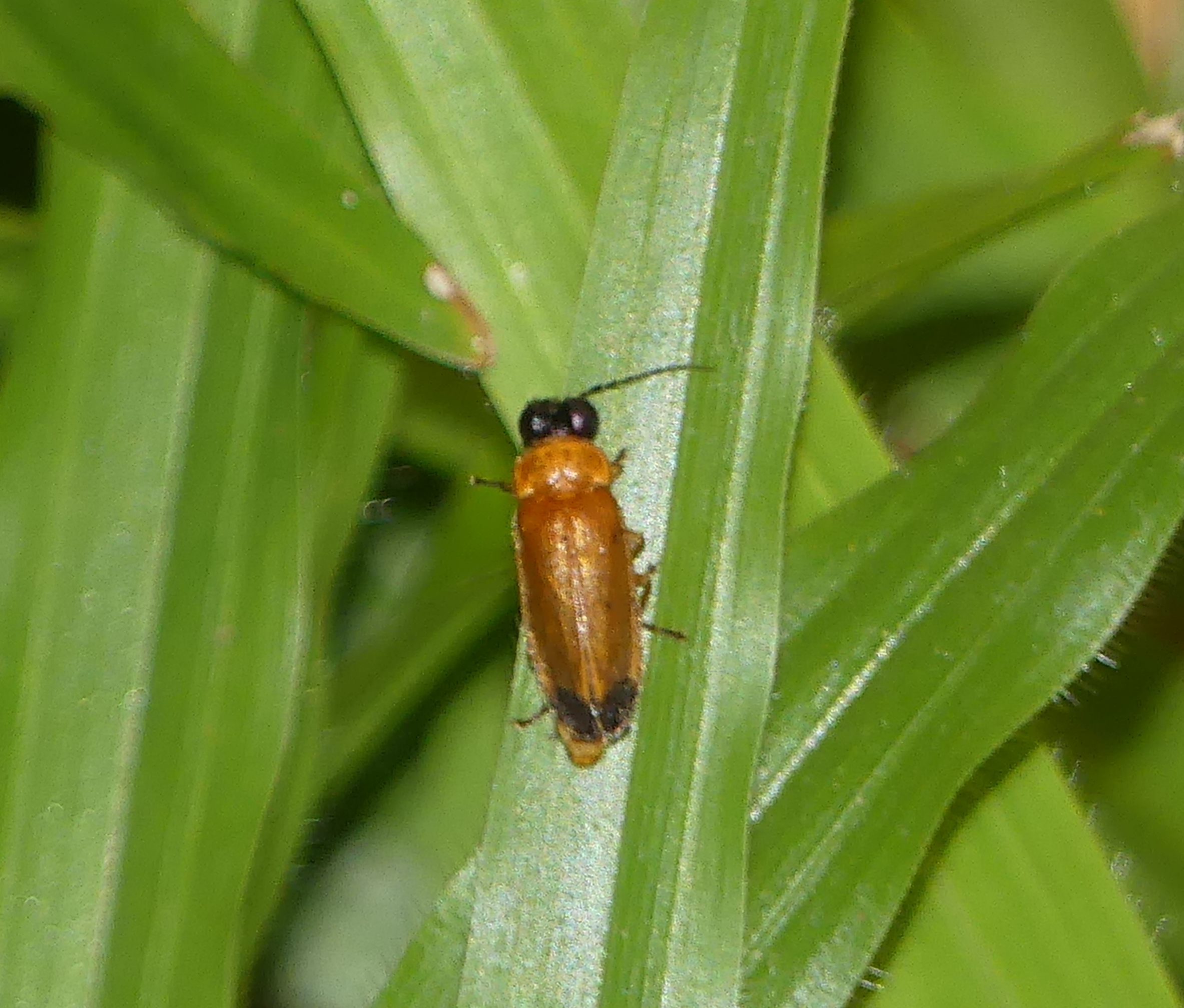
- Abscondita sp.

Scientific classification
- Kingdom: Animalia
- Phylum: Arthropoda
- Clade: Pancrustacea
- Class: Insecta
- Order: Coleoptera
- Suborder: Polyphaga
- Infraorder: Elateriformia
- Family: Lampyridae
- Subfamily: Luciolinae
- Genus: Abscondita; Ballantyne, Lambkin & Fu, 2013

Type species
- Luciola terminalis Olivier, 1883

= Abscondita =

Genus of beetles

Abscondita is a genus of fireflies in tropical Asia. Species in the genus were earlier placed in the genus Luciola but molecular phylogeny studies support their separation.

The genus is placed in the subfamily Luciolinae, in which both adult males and females are winged. Members of the genus typically have brown elytra with the apical part dark but specific identification is based on male genitalia. The genus is separated from the closely related Pygoluciola in that it as the adeagal sheath sternite evenly expanded along its length. In Pygoluciola the aediagus sheath expands near the apex. The larvae are found in soil. Adults are found mainly over moist grassy areas.

Species in the genus include:

- Abscondita anceyi (E. Olivier, 1883)
- Abscondita berembun Nada in Ballantyne et al., 2019
- Abscondita cerata (E. Olivier, 1911)
- Abscondita chinensis (Linnaeus, 1767)
- Abscondita jerangau Nada in Ballantyne et al., 2019
- Abscondita pallescens (Gorham, 1880)
- Abscondita perplexa (Walker, 1858)
- Abscondita promelaena (Walker, 1858)
- Abscondita terminalis (E. Olivier, 1883)
