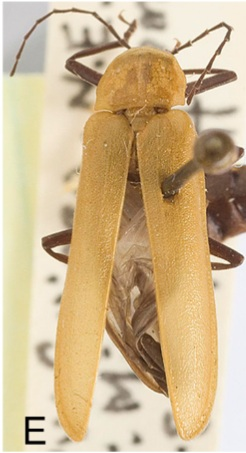

Scientific classification
- Kingdom: Animalia
- Phylum: Arthropoda
- Class: Insecta
- Order: Coleoptera
- Suborder: Polyphaga
- Infraorder: Elateriformia
- Family: Lampyridae
- Genus: Missimia; Ballantyne, 2009
- Species: M. flavida

Binomial name
- Missimia flavida Ballantyne, 2009

= Missimia =

Genus of firefly

Missimia is a genus of fireflies in the subfamily Luciolinae, consisting of only one species, Missimia flavida, a beetle of the family Lampyridae. It is found in the New Guinea Highlands, with records from Mount Missim (hence the genus name) and Mount Shungol, both in Papua New Guinea.

Males measure 12.2–13.1 mm (0.48–0.52 in) and females 12.9–13.3 mm (0.51–0.52 in) in length.
