= Artyfechinostomum =

Scientific classification
- Domain: Eukaryota
- Kingdom: Animalia
- Phylum: Platyhelminthes
- Class: Trematoda
- Order: Plagiorchiida
- Family: Echinostomatidae
- Genus: Artyfechinostomum; Lane, 1915

Genus of flatworms

Artyfechinostomum is a genus of flatworms belonging to the family Echinostomatidae.

Species:

- Artyfechinostomum malayanum
- Artyfechinostomum sufrartyfex
