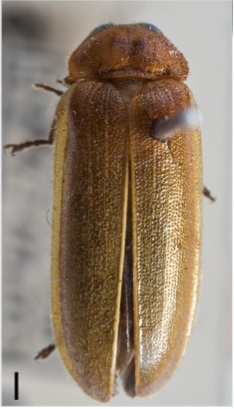

Scientific classification
- Kingdom: Animalia
- Phylum: Arthropoda
- Class: Insecta
- Order: Coleoptera
- Suborder: Polyphaga
- Infraorder: Elateriformia
- Family: Lampyridae
- Genus: Sclerotia
- Species: S. seriata

Binomial name
- Sclerotia seriata (Olivier, 1891)

Synonyms
- Luciola seriata Olivier, 1891

= Sclerotia seriata =

Species of beetle

Sclerotia seriata is a species of beetle of the family Lampyridae. It is found in Myanmar.
