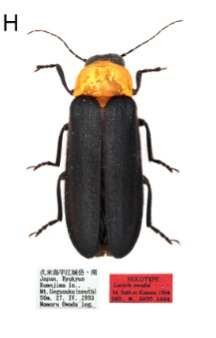

Scientific classification
- Kingdom: Animalia
- Phylum: Arthropoda
- Class: Insecta
- Order: Coleoptera
- Suborder: Polyphaga
- Infraorder: Elateriformia
- Family: Lampyridae
- Genus: Nipponoluciola
- Species: N. owadai

Binomial name
- Nipponoluciola owadai (Satô & Kimura, 1994)

Synonyms
- Luciola owadai Satô & Kimura, 1994

= Nipponoluciola owadai =

Species of beetle

Nipponoluciola owadai is a species of beetle of the family Lampyridae. It is found in Japan (Okinawa).

== Description ==
Adults reach a length of about 9.5–15.8 mm (males) and 13.1–15.7 mm (females). Their whole body (including head, mouthparts and antennae, ventral thorax, legs and abdomen) is black, except for a yellowish orange pronotum.
