= Inflata =

Scientific classification
- Domain: Eukaryota
- Kingdom: Animalia
- Phylum: Arthropoda
- Class: Insecta
- Order: Coleoptera
- Suborder: Polyphaga
- Infraorder: Elateriformia
- Superfamily: Elateroidea
- Family: Lampyridae
- Subfamily: Luciolinae
- Genus: Inflata; Boontop, 2015
- Species: I. indica

Binomial name
- Inflata indica (Motschulsky, 1854)

Synonyms
- Luciola indica Motschulsky, 1854

Genus of beetles

Inflata is a genus of 'flashing' firefly (family Lampyridae) found in Thailand, containing a single recognized species, Inflata indica.
