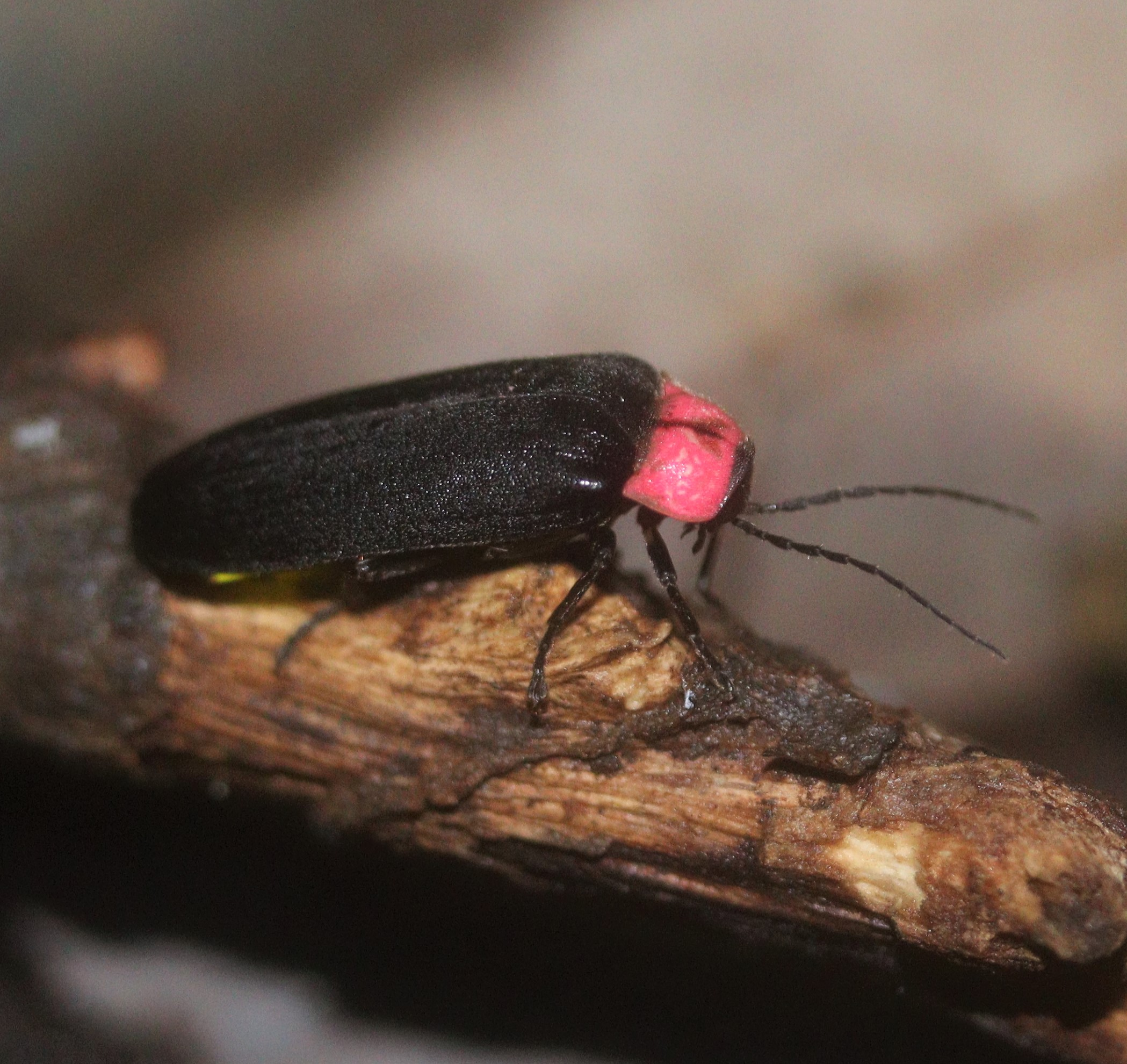
- Adult
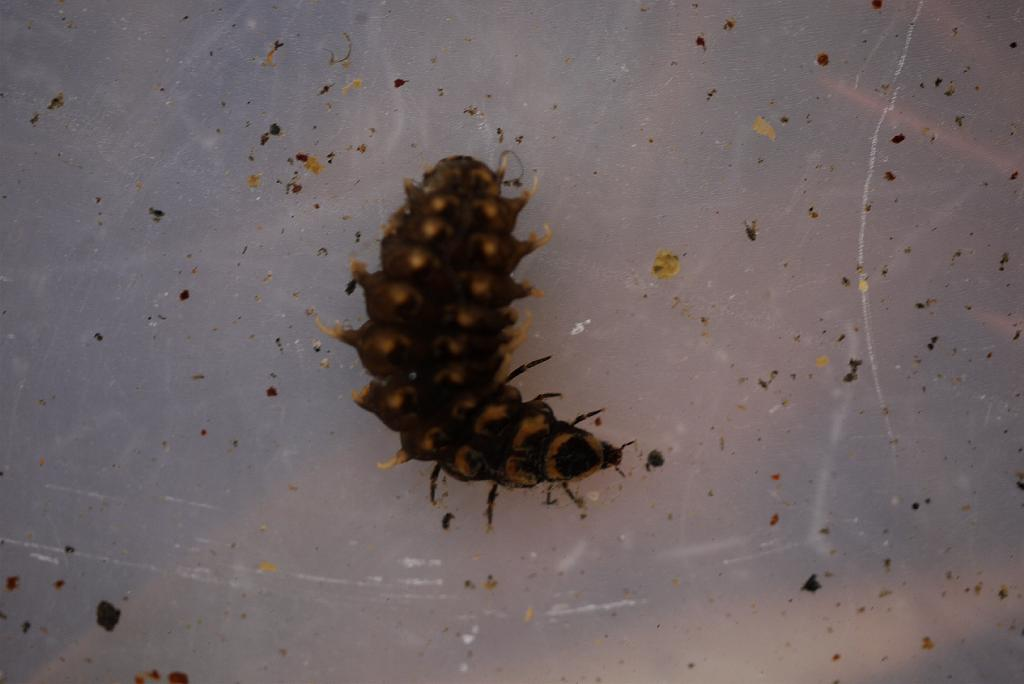
- Larva

Scientific classification
- Kingdom: Animalia
- Phylum: Arthropoda
- Class: Insecta
- Order: Coleoptera
- Suborder: Polyphaga
- Infraorder: Elateriformia
- Family: Lampyridae
- Genus: Nipponoluciola
- Species: N. cruciata

Binomial name
- Nipponoluciola cruciata (Motschulsky, 1854)

Synonyms
- Luciola cruciata Motschulsky, 1854; Luciola picticollis Kiesenwetter, 1874; Luciola cruciata towadensis Nakane, 1987

= Nipponoluciola cruciata =

Genji firefly

Species of beetle

Nipponoluciola cruciata, known as "genji-botaru" (ゲンジボタル) in Japanese, is a species of firefly found in Japan. Its habitat is small ditches and streams, and its larvae are aquatic. It was formerly known as Luciola cruciata but was revised taxonomically in 2022.

== Taxonomy ==
This species was described by Victor Motschulsky in 1854. The type locality is Japan, but it was incorrectly given as Java. Its Japanese name, "genji-botaru", may derive from The Tale of Genji, an 11th-century Japanese novel, or it may derive from the Genji clan, which won the 12th-century Genpei War. (Another, smaller firefly species, Aquatica lateralis, has the Japanese common name "heike-botaru", a possible reference to the Heike clan, the losers in the Genpei War).

== Description ==
The male is 10.5–16.5 mm (0.41–0.65 in) long and 3.0–5.0 mm (0.12–0.20 in) wide. The female is larger, 15.0–18.6 mm (0.59–0.73 in) long and 5.0–6.0 mm (0.20–0.24 in) wide. The pronotum is reddish pink, with a central marking. The black elytra are elongate. In the male, the venter is brown and pale yellow, and in the female, it is brown, yellow and reddish pink. The male's luminous organ occupies its sixth ventrite. The antennae, about 6 mm (0.24 in) long, are between the eyes, which are well developed. The larva's body is soft, with gills. It has defensive organs that are eversible (can be turned inside out).

== Distribution and habitat ==
This species occurs throughout Japan, except Hokkaido and Okinawa. There is one unconfirmed record from Korea. Its habitat is small ditches and streams, with mud or pebbles at the bottom. Adults are found from May to July.

== Behaviour and ecology ==
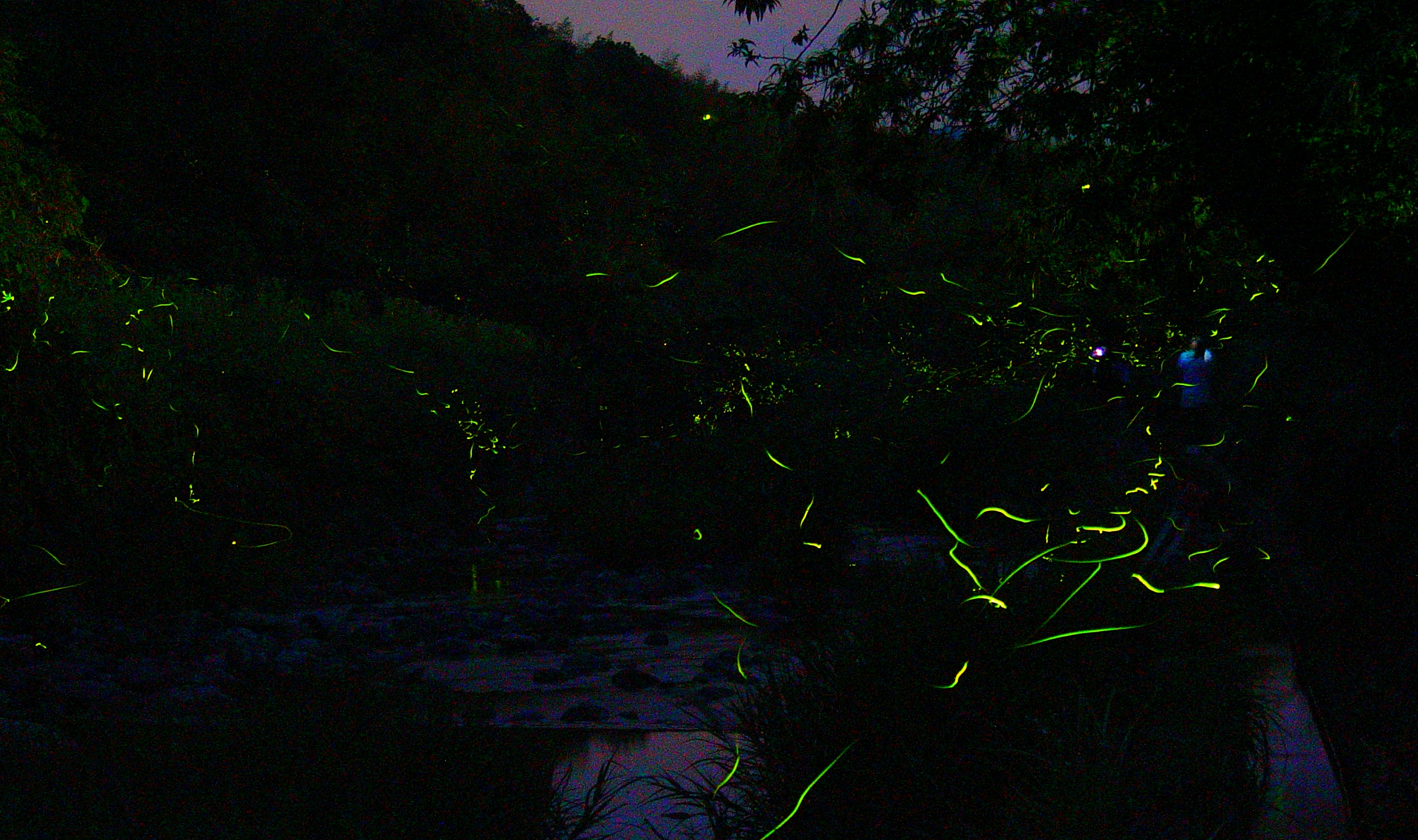
Luciola cruciata in Shimonoseki, Yamaguchi Prefecture

Larvae of Nipponoluciola cruciata are aquatic; unable to swim, they crawl at the bottom. They prey on Semisulcospira libertina snails. They have six to seven instars. The fireflies emerge from underground pupae around June. Maturity is reached in more than one year. Adults live for less than three weeks, and they do not eat anything. Their flash communication system is known as the "complex system". The flying males flash synchronously; the females do not fly while flashing, and their flashes are not synchronized. The male's flash pattern changes when it perches near a female, which emits single pulses. The male then approaches the female, and they copulate. In western Japan, there are two seconds between the male's flashes, and in northern Japan, there are four seconds. Intervals of three seconds occur between these two populations. The female lays 500–1000 eggs. In western Japan, females lay eggs in groups, but they are solitary in eastern Japan.
