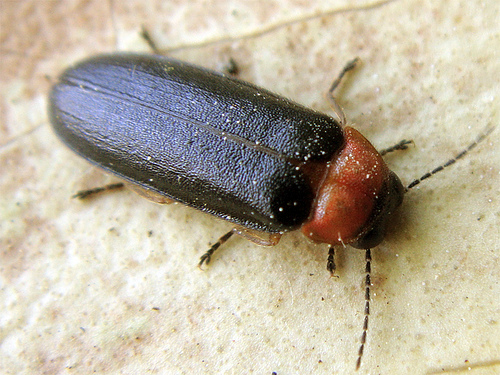
- Luciola lusitanica male

Scientific classification
- Kingdom: Animalia
- Phylum: Arthropoda
- Class: Insecta
- Order: Coleoptera
- Suborder: Polyphaga
- Infraorder: Elateriformia
- Family: Lampyridae
- Subfamily: Luciolinae; Lacordaire, 1857

Genera
- see text

= Luciolinae =

Subfamily of beetles

The Luciolinae are among the largest subfamilies of fireflies (Lampyridae). They seem to be all "flashing" (as opposed to "continuous-glow") fireflies. They are a diverse lineage, spreading throughout the warm parts of Eurasia into temperate Europe and East Asia and south to the Australian region.

Several tropical species, notably of the genus Pteroptyx, are of local economic importance. Their displays will self-synchronize until the entire local firefly population flashes in the same rhythm, creating a stunning spectacle that is popular with tourists. The most well-known location to witness these displays is on the Selangor River at Kampong Kuantan, Malaysia.

Two Japanese species of Luciola, collectively known as hotaru (蛍), are highly significant in Japanese culture and folklore. They are symbols of the hitodama (人魂 or 人玉), the souls of the newly dead. See also the explanations at the article on the movie Hotaru no Haka ("Grave of the Fireflies") for a discussion of the cultural significance of the hotaru.

== Systematics ==
The group has recently been examined using molecular phylogenetics, using fairly comprehensive sampling.

== Genera ==
- Abscondita Ballantyne, Lambkin & Fu, 2013
- Aquatica Fu, Ballantyne & Lambkin, 2010
- Aquilonia Ballantyne, 2009
- Asymmetricata Ballantyne, 2009
- Atyphella Olliff, 1890
- Australoluciola Ballantyne, 2013
- Colophotia Motschulsky, 1853
- Convexa Ballantyne, 2009
- Curtos Motschulsky, 1845
- Emarginata Ballantyne, 2019
- Emeia Fu, Ballantyne & Lambkin, 2012
- Gilvainsula Ballantyne, 2009
- Inflata Boontop, 2015
- Kuantana Ballantyne, 2019
- Lampyroidea Costa, 1875
- Lloydiella Ballantyne, 2009
- Luciola Laporte, 1833
- Magnalata Ballantyne, 2009
- Medeopteryx Ballantyne, 2013
- Missimia Ballantyne, 2009
- Nipponoluciola Ballantyne, 2022
- Pacifica Ballantyne, 2013
- Photuroluciola Pic, 1931
- Pteroptyx Olivier, 1902
- Pygatyphella Ballantyne, 1968
- Pygoluciola Wittmer, 1939
- Pyrophanes Olivier, 1885
- Sclerotia Ballantyne, 2016
- Serratia Ballantyne, 2019
- Triangulara Pimpasalee, 2016
- Trisinuata Ballantyne, 2013
