= Christine Lambkin =

Australian entomologist and scientific illustrator

Christine Lynette Lambkin is an Australian entomologist, scientific illustrator, and was curator of entomology at the Queensland Museum in Brisbane, Queensland, Australia from 2006 to 2022. She is currently an adjunct research fellow at the Queensland Museum.

== Career ==
Lambkin began her career as a science teacher in Sydney and Brisbane after graduating from the University of Queensland with a Bachelor of Science and Diploma of Education in 1976. She became a scientific illustrator at the Queensland Museum in 1986, then with the CSIRO Division of Entomology, Long Pocket, Queensland in 1993. In 1994 Lambkin completed a Certificate of Visual Arts and Design at the Queensland College of Art.

In 1995, she joined The Department of Entomology at the University of Queensland as a scientific illustrator and research assistant. In 2001, she attained a Ph.D. at the University of Queensland and became a post-doctoral fellow (2001–2005) and research scientist (2003–2006) at the CSIRO Division of Entomology, Canberra. In 2004, Lambkin was a visiting post doctoral Fellow at North Carolina State University in their Department of Entomology.

In 2006, Lambkin returned to the Queensland Museum as the curator of entomology. She was the president of the Entomological Society of Queensland in 2008 and 2015 and was awarded an honorary membership.

In 2022 she retired and is currently an adjunct research fellow.

== Awards ==
March 1997: Australian Postgraduate Award, Ph.D., 1997–2000, University of Queensland

August 2014: Peter Doherty Awards 2014 - Science Education Partnership Award for the Queensland Museum community engagement program, Backyard Explorer.

March 2015: Honorary Membership of the Entomological Society of Queensland.
