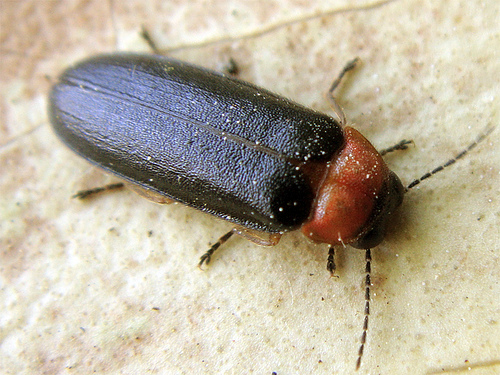
- Luciola lusitanica

Scientific classification
- Kingdom: Animalia
- Phylum: Arthropoda
- Clade: Pancrustacea
- Class: Insecta
- Order: Coleoptera
- Suborder: Polyphaga
- Infraorder: Elateriformia
- Family: Lampyridae
- Subfamily: Luciolinae
- Genus: Luciola; Laporte, 1833

Species
- Many, but see text

Synonyms
- Bourgeoisia E.Olivier, 1908; Erota Gistal, 1834; Hotaria Yuasa, 1937

= Luciola =

Genus of beetles

Luciola is a genus of flashing fireflies in the family Lampyridae. They are especially well known from Japan and are often called Japanese fireflies, but their members range farther into Asia and reach southern Europe (Italy, France, Spain, Portugal, among other countries) and Africa. This genus is traditionally held to extend to Australia, but these species do not seem to belong herein (see below for details).

== Biological description ==
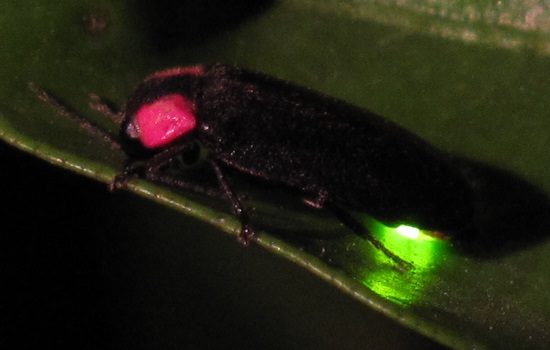
Bioluminescence of Luciola lateralis.

Unlike some other fireflies, the females of Luciola are fully winged. Ecologically, the genus is remarkable in that the larvae of several species are aquatic. The adults of the typical Luciola are similar to those of Atyphella which was formerly included in this genus. They can be easily distinguished by the males' aedeagus however, which in Luciola proper has large lateral lobes that do not taper and have elongated, slender and flattened smaller lobes along their ventral margin. The middle lobe of the males' aedeagus is very slim and has a point before the tip. By contrast, the Australian group resembles Pyrophanes in its lateral lobes of the aedeagus being small and not visible from beneath. But unlike in Pyrophanes, the sheath of the aedeagus lacks paraprocts, and the seventh ventrite of the abdomen lacks the hairy lobes and points at its hind margin.

Two Japanese species of Luciola, collectively known as hotaru (蛍), are significant in Japanese culture and folklore. They are symbols of the hitodama (人魂 or 人玉), the souls of the newly-dead. See also the explanations at the article on the movie Hotaru no Haka ("Grave of the Fireflies") for a discussion of the cultural significance of the hotaru.

== Systematics ==
Luciola in the narrow sense appears to be most closely related to a rather basal group of Luciolinae, including Bourgeoisia and Lampyroidea and Hotaria. Their relationships are not well resolved and Hotaria is sometimes merged with Luciola. On the other hand, the genera Atyphella and Pygoluciola, which for some time were included in Luciola, is now again recognized as distinct.

The internal systematics of Luciola are somewhat in need of revision, and it is not certain whether these species are all correctly assigned to this genus. For example, the Australian species appear to be separate and not very closely related to the other members of this genus, but rather to Colophotia, Pteroptyx and Pyrophanes. Whether the larvae of these can be recognized by the share soft terga lacking paranota, or whether this is a plesiomorphic trait also present in other Luciolinae, remains to be determined.

L. deplanata might be worthy of separation in a monotypic genus Photuroluciola.

But considering the fact that many species remain essentially unstudied, a 2008 review of the genus concluded that:

"A phylogenetic analysis [...] may give indications for subdivisions within Luciola. However, there are elements of the cart and the horse here – which should come first? Break up Luciola based on narrow analyses, or wait until more analyses are available? It is our contention that those Luciolinae species which do not fit elsewhere should either be described as Luciola sp. or remain undescribed until such time as phylogenetic analyses indicate a repeatable pattern of subdivisions with Luciola. Any other action would be, in our opinion, premature."

In 2010, leii, ficta, hydrophila and lateralis were transferred to the genus Aquatica.

== Species ==
These species belong to the genus Luciola:

- Luciola affinis Ritsema, 1875 (Australia)
- Luciola amplipennis Fairmaire, 1880 (Africa)
- Luciola angusticollis E. Olivier, 1886 (Southern Asia)
- Luciola antennalis Bourgeois, 1905 (Southern Asia)
- Luciola antica Boisduval, 1835 (Oceania)
- Luciola antipodum Bourgeois, 1884 (Australia)
- Luciola apicalis (Eschscholtz, 1822) (Southern Asia)
- Luciola aquilaclara Ballantyne, 2013 (Australia)
- Luciola atriceps Pic, 1916 (Africa)
- Luciola atrimembris Pic, 1933 (Southern Asia)
- Luciola atripes Pic, 1929 (Southern Asia)
- Luciola atritarsis Pic, 1916 (Africa)
- Luciola atriventris Pic, 1925 (Africa)
- Luciola aurantiaca Pic, 1927 (Southern Asia)
- Luciola auritula E. Olivier, 1910 (Southern Asia)
- Luciola basipennis Pic, 1958 (Africa)
- Luciola bicoloriceps Pic, 1924 (Southern Asia)
- Luciola bimaculata Klug, 1855 (Africa)
- Luciola bimaculicollis (Boheman, 1851) (Africa)
- Luciola binhana Pic, 1927 (Southern Asia)
- Luciola binotata Pic, 1951 (Africa)
- Luciola biscutellata Fairmaire, 1896 (Africa)
- Luciola bomansi Pic, 1956 (Africa)
- Luciola bourgeoisi E. Olivier, 1895 (Southern Asia)
- Luciola burgeoni Pic, 1931 (Africa)
- Luciola caffra (Boheman, 1851) (Africa)
- Luciola candezei E. Olivier, 1902 (Southern Asia)
- Luciola capensis (Fabricius, 1775) (Africa)
- Luciola carinaticollis Pic, 1952 (Africa)
- Luciola cavifrons Fairmaire, 1900 (Africa)
- Luciola chapaensis Pic, 1923 (Southern Asia)
- Luciola christyi Pic, 1931 (Africa)
- Luciola cincta (Fabricius, 1787) (Southern Asia)
- Luciola cincticollis Klug, 1855 (Africa)
- Luciola cingulata E. Olivier, 1885 (Southern Asia)
- Luciola cisteloides Klug, 1855 (Africa)
- Luciola clara E. Olivier, 1907 (Southern Asia)
- Luciola collarti Pic, 1931 (Africa)
- Luciola complanata Gorham, 1895 (Southern Asia)
- Luciola completelimbata Pic, 1952 (Africa)
- Luciola concreta E. Olivier, 1907 (Southern Asia)
- Luciola congoana E. Olivier, 1895 (Africa)
- Luciola consobrina Hicker, 1942 (Africa)
- Luciola costulata Fairmaire, 1886 (Africa)
- Luciola coxalis E. Olivier, 1883 (Africa)
- Luciola cruciata Motschulsky, 1854 genji-botaru (大端黑螢) (Europe & Asia)
- Luciola curticollis Pic, 1927 (Southern Asia)
- Luciola curtithorax Pic, 1928 (Southern Asia)
- Luciola davidis E. Olivier, 1895 (Southern Asia)
- Luciola delauneyi Bourgeois, 1890 (Southern Asia)
- Luciola deleta Fairmaire, 1896 (Africa)
- Luciola deplanata Pic, 1929 (Southern Asia)
- Luciola dilatata Pic, 1929 (Southern Asia)
- Luciola dilecta E. Olivier, 1908 (Africa)
- Luciola discicollis Laporte, 1833 (Africa)
- Luciola discobrunnescens Pic, 1951 (Africa)
- Luciola discoidalis Pic, 1931 (Africa)
- Luciola dregei (Motschulsky, 1853) (Africa)
- Luciola errans E. Olivier, 1902 (Africa)
- Luciola exigua (Gyllenhal, 1817) (Southern Asia)
- Luciola exoleta Motschulsky, 1854 (Africa)
- Luciola exstincta E. Olivier, 1886 (Southern Asia)
- Luciola extricans (Walker, 1858) (Southern Asia)
- Luciola falsa E. Olivier, 1907 (Africa)
- Luciola fasciiventris Fairmaire, 1898 (Africa)
- Luciola filiformis E. Olivier, 1913 (Southern Asia)
- Luciola fissicollis Fairmaire, 1891 (Southern Asia)
- Luciola flava Pic, 1929 (Southern Asia)
- Luciola flavescens (Boisduval, 1835) (Oceania)
- Luciola flebilis E. Olivier, 1909 (Southern Asia)
- Luciola fukiensis Pic, 1955 (Southern Asia)
- Luciola fusca (Motschulsky, 1854) (Africa)
- Luciola fuscula (Boheman, 1851) (Africa)
- Luciola gaiffei Alluaud, 1899 (Africa)
- Luciola galactopyga Fairmaire, 1884 (Africa)
- Luciola gaudens E. Olivier, 1910 (Africa)
- Luciola gemina E. Olivier, 1905 (Africa)
- Luciola geniculata E. Olivier, 1902 (Africa)
- Luciola ghesquierei Pic, 1934 (Africa)
- Luciola gigantea Pic, 1916 (Africa)
- Luciola gigas E. Olivier, 1888 (Africa and Southern Asia)
- Luciola gowdeyi Pic, 1933 (Africa)
- Luciola grandjeani Pic, 1931 (Africa)
- Luciola guerini Laporte, 1833 (Australia)
- Luciola hirticeps E. Olivier, 1888 (Southern Asia)
- Luciola horni Bourgeois, 1905 (Southern Asia)
- Luciola hypocrita E. Olivier, 1888 (Australia and Oceania)
- Luciola ibukiyamana Nawa, 1921 (Southern Asia)
- Luciola imbellis E. Olivier, 1908 (Africa)
- Luciola imerinae Bourgeois, 1899 (Africa)
- Luciola immarginata Bourgeois, 1890 (Southern Asia)
- Luciola impedita E. Olivier, 1902 (Southern Asia)
- Luciola incerta (Boisduval, 1835) (Oceania)
- Luciola infuscata (Erichson, 1834) (Southern Asia)
- Luciola inlateralis Pic, 1952 (Africa)
- Luciola innotatipennis Pic, 1916 (Africa)
- Luciola insignis E. Olivier, 1883 (Africa)
- Luciola intermedia Fairmaire, 1896 (Africa)
- Luciola intricata (Walker, 1858) (Southern Asia)
- Luciola italica (Linnaeus, 1767) (Europe & Northern Asia)
- Luciola japonica (Thunberg, 1784) (Africa and Southern Asia)
- Luciola jeanvoinei Pic, 1927 (Southern Asia)
- Luciola jengai Nada, 2019 (Southern Asia)
- Luciola judaica E. Olivier, 1884 (Europe & Northern Asia)
- Luciola kagiana Matsumura, 1928 (Southern Asia)
- Luciola kervillei E. Olivier, 1909 (Europe & Northern Asia)
- Luciola klapperichi Pic, 1955 (Southern Asia)
- Luciola krugeri E. Olivier, 1905 (Africa)
- Luciola kuroiwae Matsumura, 1918 (Southern Asia)
- Luciola laeta Gerstaecker, 1871 (Africa)
- Luciola lambkinae Keller & Ballantyne, 2021 (Southern Asia)
- Luciola latediscoidalis Pic, 1952 (Africa)
- Luciola latelimbata Pic, 1956 (Africa)
- Luciola laticollis Gorham, 1883 (Southern Asia)
- Luciola leroyi Pic, 1952 (Africa)
- Luciola limbalis Fairmaire, 1889 (Southern Asia)
- Luciola limbatipennis Pic, 1923 (Southern Asia)
- Luciola longula E. Olivier, 1914 (Africa)
- Luciola lucernula Reiche, 1850 (Africa)
- Luciola lusitanica (Charpentier, 1825) (Europe & Northern Asia)
- Luciola maculiscuta Fairmaire, 1884 (Africa)
- Luciola madagascariensis (Guérin-Méneville, 1831) (Africa)
- Luciola magambae McDermott, 1963 (Africa)
- Luciola maindroni Pic, 1927 (Southern Asia)
- Luciola major Pic, 1952 (Africa)
- Luciola mareei Pic, 1952 (Africa)
- Luciola mediodivisa Pic, 1952 (Africa)
- Luciola mediojuncta Pic, 1952 (Africa)
- Luciola melancholica E. Olivier, 1913 (Australia)
- Luciola melanura Laporte, 1833 (Africa)
- Luciola mendax E. Olivier, 1905 (Africa)
- Luciola mocquerysi E. Olivier, 1902 (Africa)
- Luciola mongolica Motschulsky, 1860 (Europe & Northern Asia)
- Luciola multicostulata Pic, 1927 (Southern Asia)
- Luciola mutata Pic, 1939 (Africa)
- Luciola niah Jusoh, 2019 (Southern Asia)
- Luciola nicolleri Bugnion, 1922 (Southern Asia)
- Luciola nigripes Gorham, 1903 (Southern Asia)
- Luciola nigritarsis Pic, 1927 (Southern Asia)
- Luciola nitidicollis Pic, 1916 (Africa)
- Luciola nitidula (Fabricius, 1781) (Africa)
- Luciola noctivaga E. Olivier, 1907 (Southern Asia)
- Luciola notaticollis Pic, 1914 (Southern Asia)
- Luciola novaki Müller, 1946 (Europe & Northern Asia)
- Luciola obscura Pic, 1928 (Southern Asia)
- Luciola obscuripennis Klug, 1855 (Africa)
- Luciola ochracea Gorham, 1895 (Southern Asia)
- Luciola oculofissa Ballantyne, 2013 (Australia)
- Luciola olivieri Bourgeois, 1908 (Africa)
- Luciola overlaeti Pic, 1931 (Africa)
- Luciola owadai Satô & Kimura, 1994 - Kumejima-botaru - (Southern Asia)
- Luciola pallida Kolbe, 1883 (Africa)
- Luciola pallidipes Pic, 1928 (Southern Asia)
- Luciola papariensis Doi, 1932 (Southern Asia)
- Luciola parvula Kiesenwetter, 1874 (Southern Asia)
- Luciola pattersoni Pic, 1935 (Africa)
- Luciola perpetiuscula Kolbe, 1887 (Africa)
- Luciola perspicua E. Olivier, 1907 (Southern Asia)
- Luciola picea Gorham, 1882 (Southern Asia)
- Luciola pici McDermott, 1966 (Southern Asia)
- Luciola picticollis Kiesenwetter, 1874 (Southern Asia)
- Luciola pieli Pic, 1939 (Southern Asia)
- Luciola pouilloni Pic, 1931 (Africa)
- Luciola praestans E. Olivier, 1896 (Africa)
- Luciola praetermissa E. Olivier, 1909 (Africa)
- Luciola pumila (Boheman, 1851) (Africa)
- Luciola puncticollis Laporte, 1833 (Africa)
- Luciola quadrimaculata Pic, 1952 (Africa)
- Luciola recticollis E. Olivier, 1900 (Southern Asia)
- Luciola robusticeps Pic, 1928 (Southern Asia)
- Luciola roseicolllis Pic, 1933 (Southern Asia)
- Luciola ruficollis (Guérin-Méneville, 1830) (Australia)
- Luciola rugiceps E. Olivier, 1886 (Southern Asia)
- Luciola satoi Jeng & Yang, 2003 (Southern Asia)
- Luciola scheitzae Pic, 1952 (Africa)
- Luciola semiventralis Fairmaire, 1899 (Africa)
- Luciola semivittata Pic, 1952 (Africa)
- Luciola septemmaculata E. Olivier, 1888 (Africa)
- Luciola singapura Jusoh & Ballantyne, 2021 (Singapore)
- Luciola sordida E. Olivier, 1905 (Southern Asia)
- Luciola spectralis Gorham, 1880 (Australia)
- Luciola spilodera Fairmaire, 1898 (Africa)
- Luciola stanleyi E. Olivier, 1913 (Africa)
- Luciola stigmaticollis Fairmaire, 1887 (Southern Asia)
- Luciola subunicolor Pic, 1931 (Africa)
- Luciola sudra Gorham, 1903 (Southern Asia)
- Luciola syriaca (Costa, 1875) (Southern Asia)
- Luciola tabida Gorham, 1880 (Africa)
- Luciola taeniaticollis Fairmaire, 1886 (Africa)
- Luciola tenuicornis E. Olivier, 1885 (Australia)
- Luciola testaceipes Pic, 1916 (Africa)
- Luciola testaceiventris Pic, 1916 (Africa)
- Luciola tetrasticta Fairmaire, 1888 (Africa)
- Luciola tincticollis Gorham, 1895 (Southern Asia)
- Luciola tiomana Ballantyne, 2019 (Southern Asia)
- Luciola trimaculata Pic, 1916 (Africa)
- Luciola trivandrensis Raj, 1947 (Southern Asia)
- Luciola tsushimana Nakane, 1970 (Southern Asia)
- Luciola tuberculata Yiu, 2017 (Southern Asia)
- Luciola turneri Pic, 1934 (Africa)
- Luciola umbratica E. Olivier, 1907 (Africa)
- Luciola unmunsana Doi, 1931 (Southern Asia)
- Luciola varia E. Olivier, 1908 (Southern Asia)
- Luciola vittata Laporte, 1833 (Southern Asia)
- Luciola vleeschouwersi Pic, 1952 (Africa)
- Luciola xanthochroa Fairmaire, 1904 (Africa)
- Luciola xanthura Gorham, 1880 (Southern Asia)
