= List of Sciaridae genera =

This is a list of 96 genera in the family Sciaridae, dark-winged fungus gnats.

== Sciaridae genera ==
- Acuatella ^{c g}
- Aerumnosa ^{c g}
- Afrosciara ^{c g}
- Allopnyxia ^{c g}
- Amesicrium ^{c g}
- Angustosciara ^{c g}
- Apelmocreagris ^{c g}
- Archicratyna ^{c g}
- Austrosciara ^{c g}
- Baeosciara Tuomikoski, 1960^{g}
- Brachisia ^{c g}
- Bradysia Winnertz, 1867^{i c g b}
- Bradysiopsis ^{c g}
- Camptochaeta ^{c g}
- Cesathrix ^{c g}
- Chaetosciara ^{i c g}
- Claustropyga ^{c g}
- Corynoptera ^{i c g}
- Cottia ^{c g}
- Cratyna ^{c g}
- Ctenosciara ^{c g}
- Dichopygina ^{c g}
- Dodecasciara ^{c g}
- Dolichosciara ^{c g}
- Edidapus ^{i}
- Epidapus (Epidapus) unistylatus Röschmann & Mohrig, 1995^{c g b}
- Eugnoriste Coquillett, 1896^{i c g b}
- Euricrium ^{c g}
- Eurobradysia ^{c g}
- Eurysciara ^{c g}
- Faratsiho ^{c g}
- Gephyromma ^{c g}
- Hermapterosciara ^{c g}
- Hybosciara ^{c g}
- Hyperlasion Schmitz^{i c g}
- Keilbachia ^{c g}
- Leptosciarella ^{c g}
- Leucosciara ^{c g}
- Lobosciara ^{c g}
- Lycoriella ^{i c g}
- Manusciaria ^{c g}
- Manzumbadoa ^{c g}
- Merianina ^{c g}
- Metangela ^{i c g}
- Mixosciaritis Hong, 2002^{g}
- Moehnia ^{i c g}
- Mohrigia ^{c g}
- Mouffetina Frey, 1942^{g}
- Nahua ^{c g}
- Neophnyxia ^{c g}
- Neozygoneura ^{c g}
- Odontosciara Rübsaamen, 1908^{i c g b}
- Ostroverkhovana ^{c g}
- Parapnyxia ^{c g}
- Pelliciplanta ^{c g}
- Peniosciara ^{c g}
- Peyerimhoffia Kieffer, 1903,1910^{g}
- Phorodonta Coquillett, 1910^{g}
- Phytosciara ^{i c g}
- Plastosciara ^{i}
- Pnyxia Johannsen, 1912^{i c g b}
- Pnyxiopalpus ^{c g}
- Pnyxiopsis ^{c g}
- Prosciara Frey, 1942^{g}
- Protosciara Quiévreux, 1938^{g}
- Pseudoaerumnosa ^{c g}
- Pseudolycoriella ^{c g}
- Pseudosciara ^{i c g}
- Pseudozygomma ^{c g}
- Pseudozygoneura ^{c g}
- Psilomegalosphys ^{c g}
- Qisciara ^{c g}
- Rhynchomegalosphys ^{c g}
- Rhynchosciara ^{i c g}
- Rubsaameniella Meunier, 1903^{g}
- Scatopsciara ^{i c g}
- Schwenckfeldina ^{c g}
- Schwenkfeldina ^{i g}
- Sciara Meigen, 1803^{i c g b}
- Sciarotricha ^{c g}
- Scythropochroa ^{i c g}
- Spathobdella Frey^{i}
- Starkomyia Jaschhof, 2004^{g}
- Succinosciara Mohrig & Roschmann, 1995^{g}
- Taiwan ^{c g}
- Tergosciara ^{c g}
- Trichodapus ^{c g}
- Trichomegalosphys ^{c g}
- Trichosciara ^{c g}
- Trichosia ^{c g}
- Trichosillana ^{c g}
- Vulgarisciara ^{c g}
- Xenosciara ^{c g}
- Xylosciara ^{c g}
- Zygoneura Meigen, 1830^{i c g b}

Data sources: i = ITIS, c = Catalogue of Life, g = GBIF, b = Bugguide.net
