= Bradysia similigibbosa =

Scientific classification
- Domain: Eukaryota
- Kingdom: Animalia
- Phylum: Arthropoda
- Class: Insecta
- Order: Diptera
- Family: Sciaridae
- Genus: Bradysia
- Species: B. similigibbosa

Binomial name
- Bradysia similigibbosa Köhler & Menzel, 2013

Species of fly

Bradysia similigibbosa is a species of fungus gnat from New Caledonia.
