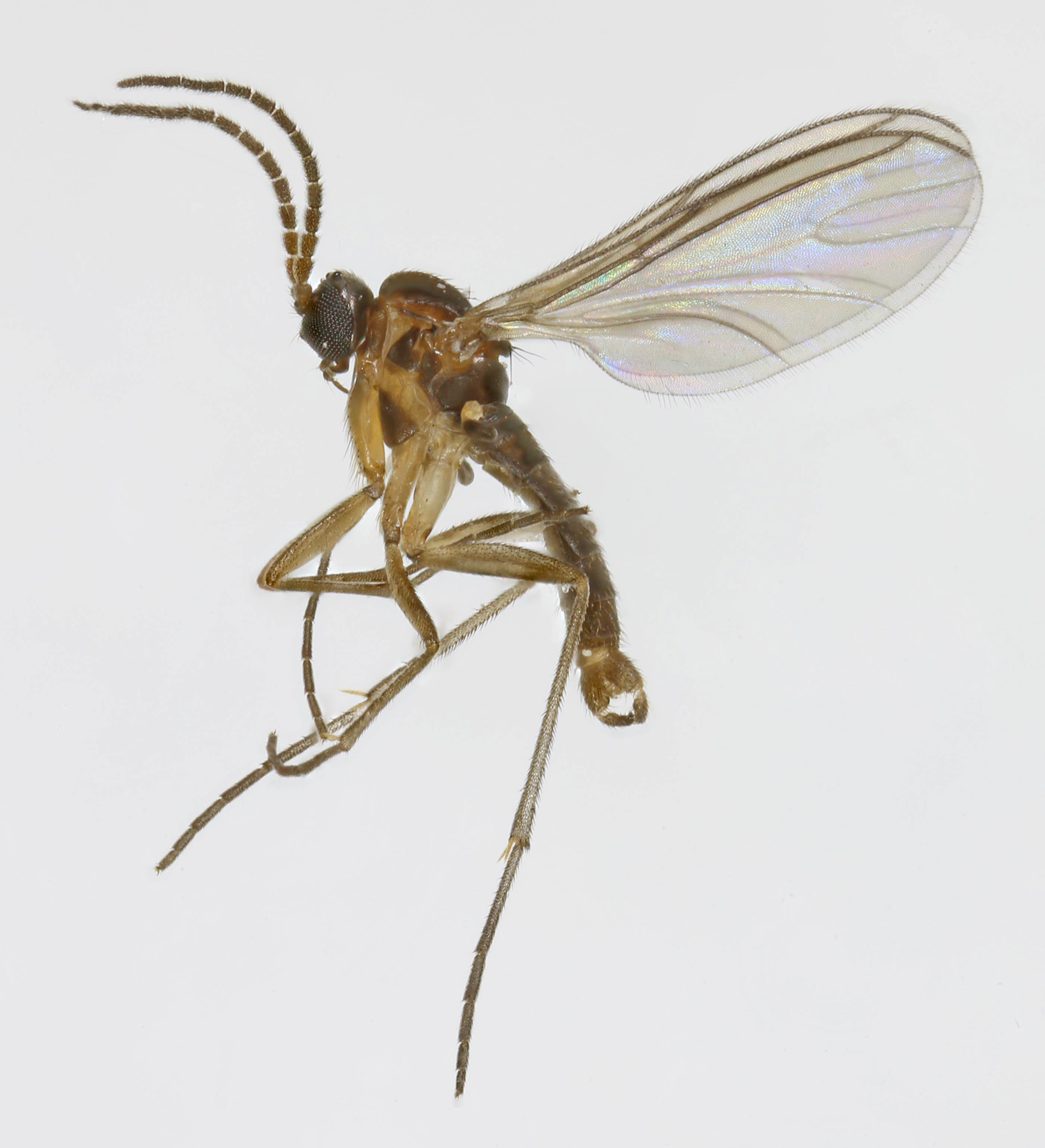
- Bradysia ocellaris North Wales

Scientific classification
- Kingdom: Animalia
- Phylum: Arthropoda
- Class: Insecta
- Order: Diptera
- Family: Sciaridae
- Genus: Bradysia
- Species: B. ocellaris

Binomial name
- Bradysia ocellaris (Comstock, 1882)

Synonyms
- Bradysia tritici

= Bradysia ocellaris =

Species of fly

Bradysia ocellaris is a species of fly in the family Sciaridae. It is found in the Palearctic. It has also been introduced to Australia. It feeds on fungi, and larvae can feed on cultivated plants in greenhouses.
