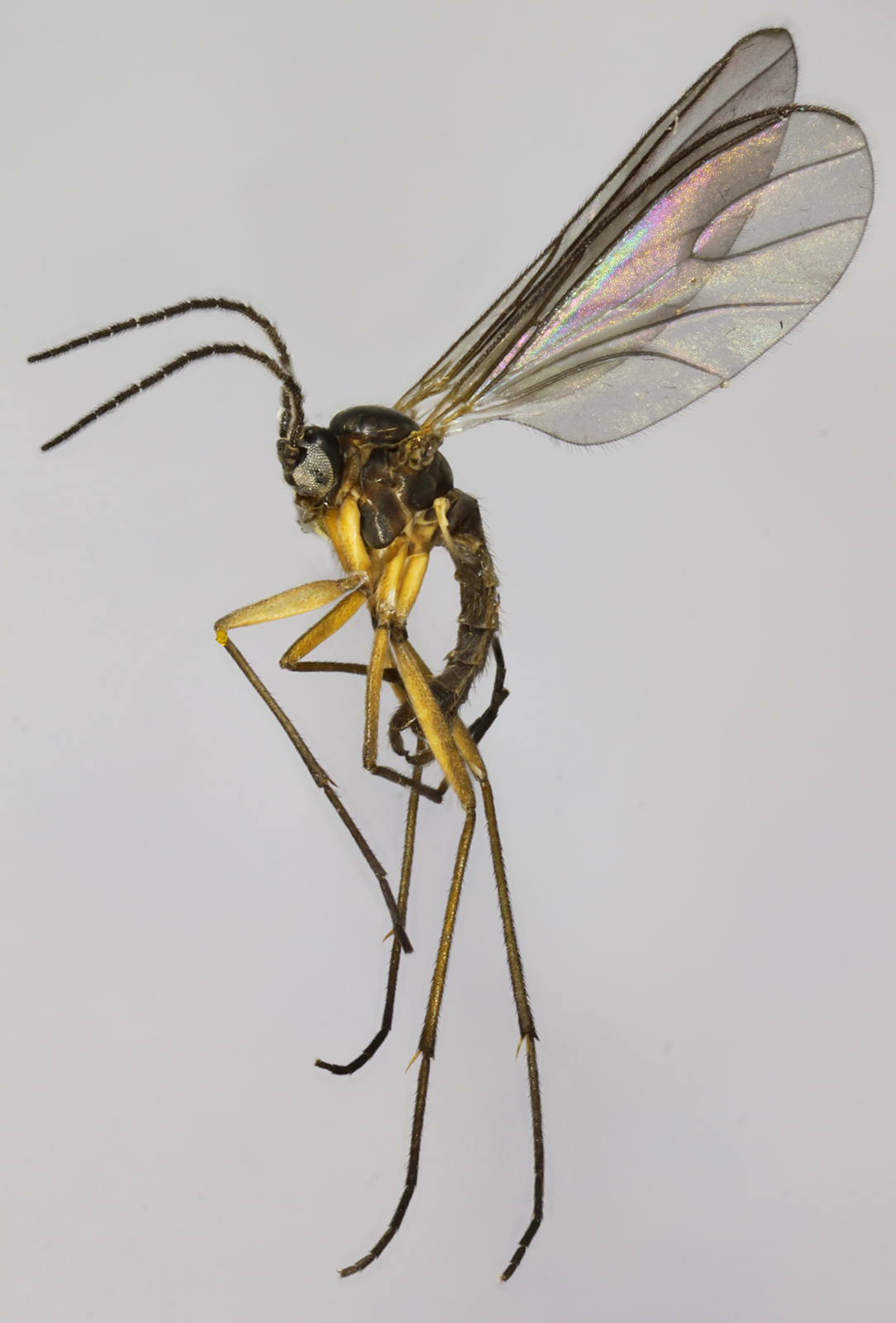

Scientific classification
- Domain: Eukaryota
- Kingdom: Animalia
- Phylum: Arthropoda
- Class: Insecta
- Order: Diptera
- Family: Sciaridae
- Genus: Bradysia
- Species: B. fungicola

Binomial name
- Bradysia fungicola (Winnertz, 1867)

= Bradysia fungicola =

Species of fly

Bradysia fungicola is a species of fly in the family Sciaridae. It is found in the Palearctic.
