= Epidapus subgracilis =

Scientific classification
- Kingdom: Animalia
- Phylum: Arthropoda
- Clade: Pancrustacea
- Class: Insecta
- Order: Diptera
- Family: Sciaridae
- Genus: Epidapus
- Species: E. subgracilis

Binomial name
- Epidapus subgracilis Menzel et al., 2006

Species of fly

Epidapus subgracilis is a species of fungus gnat found in the British Isles.
