= Corynoptera flavosignata =

Scientific classification
- Kingdom: Animalia
- Phylum: Arthropoda
- Class: Insecta
- Order: Diptera
- Family: Sciaridae
- Genus: Corynoptera
- Species: C. flavosignata

Binomial name
- Corynoptera flavosignata Menzel et al., 2006

Species of fly

Corynoptera flavosignata is a species of fungus gnat found in the British Isles.
