= Corynoptera elegans =

Scientific classification
- Domain: Eukaryota
- Kingdom: Animalia
- Phylum: Arthropoda
- Class: Insecta
- Order: Diptera
- Family: Sciaridae
- Genus: Corynoptera
- Species: C. elegans

Binomial name
- Corynoptera elegans Bischoff de Alzuet & Najt, 1973

Species of fly

Corynoptera elegans is a species of dark-winged fungus gnats in the genus Corynoptera found in Buenos Aires Province of Argentina.
