= Bradysia nigrispina =

Scientific classification
- Domain: Eukaryota
- Kingdom: Animalia
- Phylum: Arthropoda
- Class: Insecta
- Order: Diptera
- Family: Sciaridae
- Genus: Bradysia
- Species: B. nigrispina

Binomial name
- Bradysia nigrispina Menzel et al., 2006

Species of fly

Bradysia nigrispina is a species of fungus gnat found in the British Isles.
