= Odontosciara nigra =

Scientific classification
- Domain: Eukaryota
- Kingdom: Animalia
- Phylum: Arthropoda
- Class: Insecta
- Order: Diptera
- Family: Sciaridae
- Genus: Odontosciara
- Species: O. nigra

Binomial name
- Odontosciara nigra (Wiedemann, 1821)

Synonyms
- Sciara nigra Wiedemann, 1821

Species of fly

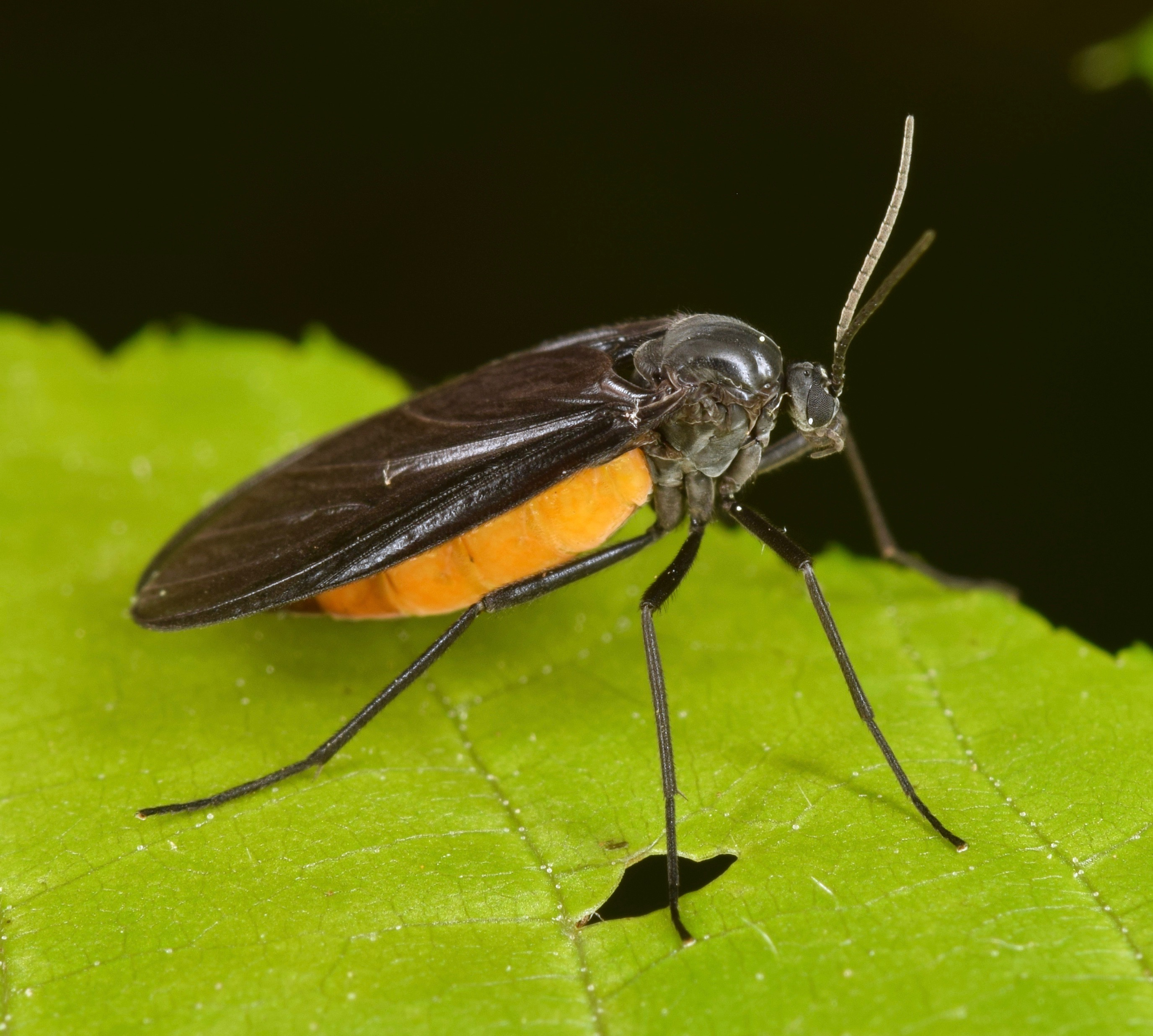
Odontosciara nigra

Odontosciara nigra is a species of dark-winged fungus gnats in the family Sciaridae.
