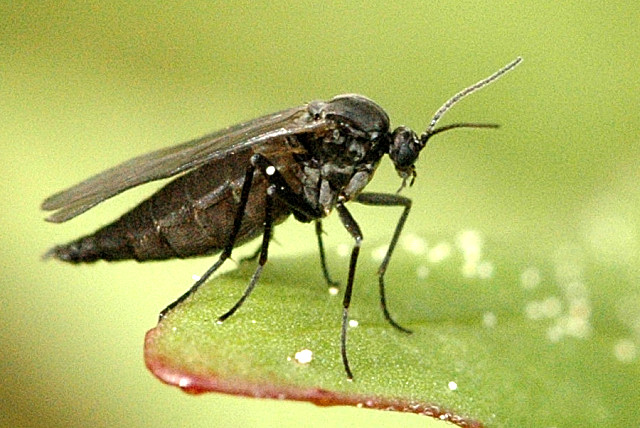

Scientific classification
- Domain: Eukaryota
- Kingdom: Animalia
- Phylum: Arthropoda
- Class: Insecta
- Order: Diptera
- Family: Sciaridae
- Genus: Bradysia
- Species: B. praecox

Binomial name
- Bradysia praecox (Meigen, 1818)

= Bradysia praecox =

Species of fly

Bradysia praecox is a species of fly in the family Sciaridae. It is found in the Palearctic.
