= Sciara sciophila =

Scientific classification
- Kingdom: Animalia
- Phylum: Arthropoda
- Class: Insecta
- Order: Diptera
- Family: Sciaridae
- Genus: Sciara
- Species: S. sciophila

Binomial name
- Sciara sciophila Loew, 1869

Synonyms
- Sciara obscura Harris, 1835

Species of fly

Sciara sciophila is a species of dark-winged fungus gnats in the family Sciaridae.
