= Pnyxia scabiei =

Scientific classification
- Kingdom: Animalia
- Phylum: Arthropoda
- Class: Insecta
- Order: Diptera
- Family: Sciaridae
- Genus: Pnyxia
- Species: P. scabiei

Binomial name
- Pnyxia scabiei (Hopkins, 1895)

Synonyms
- Epidapus scabiei Hopkins, 1895

Species of fly

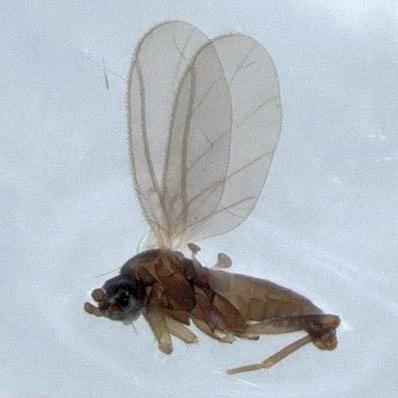
Pnyxia scabiei male

Pnyxia scabiei, the potato scab gnat, is a species of dark-winged fungus gnats, insects in the family Sciaridae.
