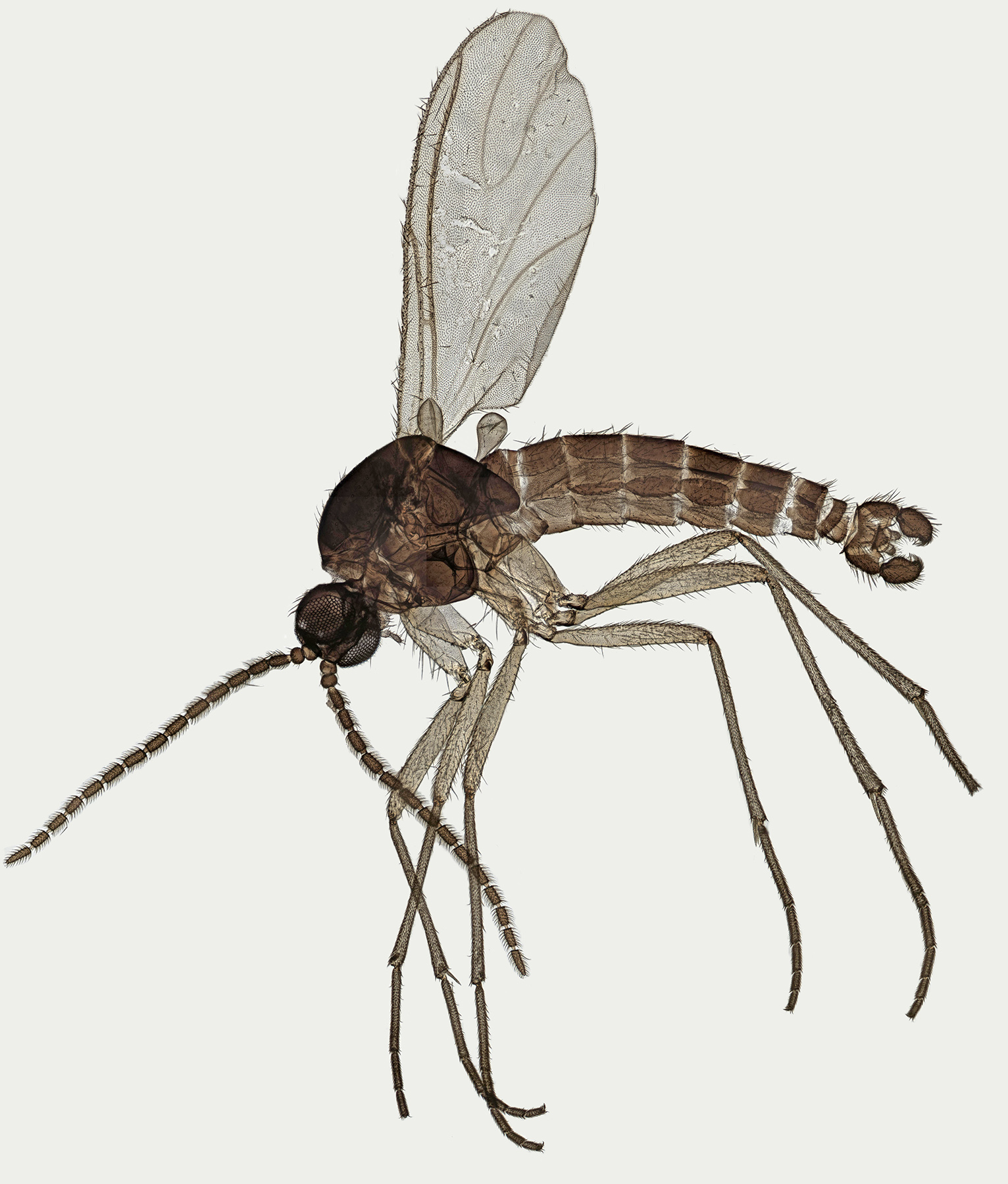
- Corynoptera forcipata from North Wales

Scientific classification
- Domain: Eukaryota
- Kingdom: Animalia
- Phylum: Arthropoda
- Class: Insecta
- Order: Diptera
- Family: Sciaridae
- Genus: Corynoptera
- Species: C. forcipata

Binomial name
- Corynoptera forcipata (Winnertz, 1867)

= Corynoptera forcipata =

Species of fly

Corynoptera forcipata is a species of fly in the family Sciaridae. It is found in the Palearctic realm.
