= Epidapus =

Scientific classification
- Kingdom: Animalia
- Phylum: Arthropoda
- Class: Insecta
- Order: Diptera
- Family: Sciaridae
- Genus: Epidapus; Haliday in Walker, 1851

Synonyms
- Atomaria Bigot, 1854; Aptanogyna Börner, 1903; Mycosciara Kieffer, 1903; Pholeosciara Schmitz, 1915; Landrockia Czizek, 1917; Calcaromyia Vimmer, 1926; Schmitzia Vimmer, 1926; Soudekia Vimmer, 1928; Lengersdorfia Kratochvil, 1936; Vimmeria Kratochvil, 1936; Sciarobezzia Venturi, 1964; Bonessia Gerbachevskaya Pavluchenko, 1986

Genus of flies

Epidapus is a genus of fungus gnats in the family Sciaridae.

== Species ==
- Epidapus Haliday in Walker, 1851
  - E. alnicola (Tuomikoski, 1957)
  - E. antegracilis Mohrig & Dimitrova, 1993
  - E. atomarius (De Geer, 1778)
  - E. bipalpatus Mohrig, 1982
  - E. brachyflagellatus Mohrig & Röschmann, 1996
  - E. detriticola (Kratochvil, 1936)
  - E. fagicola Hondru, 1968
  - E. gracilis (Walker, 1848)
  - E. ignotus (Lengersdorf, 1942)
  - E. lucifuga (Mohrig, 1970)
  - E. macrohalteratus Mohrig & Menzel, 1992
  - E. microthorax (Börner, 1903)
  - E. montivivus (Mohrig, 1970)
  - E. postdetriticola Mohrig & Röschmann, 1996
  - E. primulus Rudzinski, 2000
  - E. schillei (Börner, 1903)
  - E. spinosulus Mohrig & Blasco-Zumeta, 1996
  - E. subdetriticola Mohrig & Röschmann, 1996
  - E. subgracilis Menzel & Mohrig, 2006
  - E. subspinosulus Rudzinski & Baumjohann, 2009
- Pseudoaptanogyna Vimmer, 1926
  - E. abieticola Frey, 1948
  - E. absconditus (Vimmer, 1926)
  - E. anomalus Mohrig & Dimitrova, 1993
  - E. bispinulosus Mohrig & Kauschke, 1994
  - E. canicattii Mohrig & Kauschke, 1994
  - E. carpaticus (Mohrig & Mamaev, 1985)
  - E. debilis Menzel, 2003
  - E. echinatum Mohrig & Kozanek, 1992
  - E. gracillimus Mohrig, 1994
  - E. ignavus (Lengersdorf, 1941)
