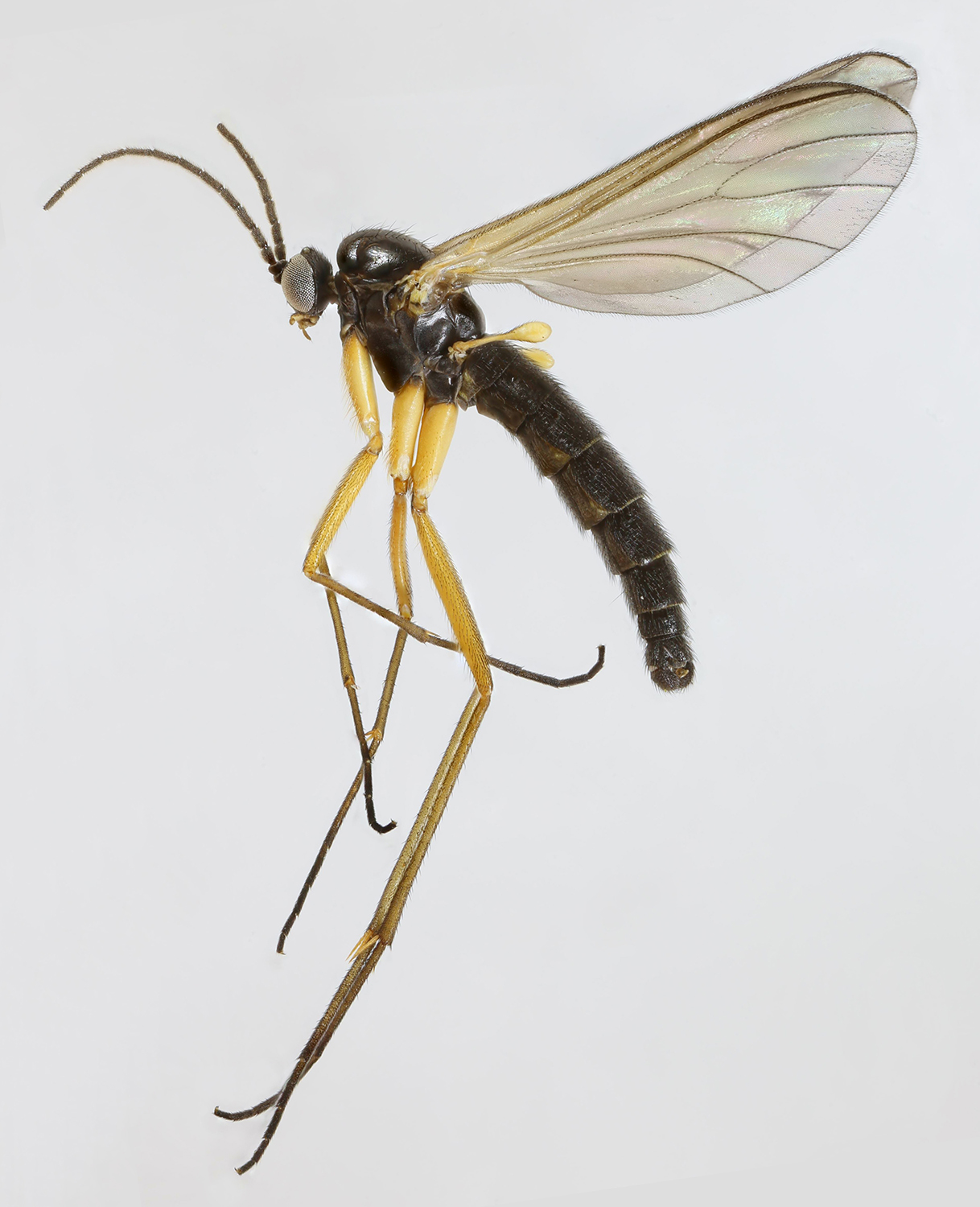
- T. morio

Scientific classification
- Domain: Eukaryota
- Kingdom: Animalia
- Phylum: Arthropoda
- Class: Insecta
- Order: Diptera
- Family: Sciaridae
- Genus: Trichosia; Winnertz, 1867

Subgenera
- Baeosciara; Mouffetina; Trichosia

= Trichosia =

Genus of gnats

The plant genus Trichosia is nowadays considered a synonym of Eria.

Trichosia is a genus of fungus gnats that feed on decaying organic matter and fungi. The subgenus Mouffetina is treated by some as a genus, while Baeosciara was originally described as a genus.

== Systematics and selected species ==
Subgenus Baeosciara Tuomikoski, 1966

- T. scotica (Edwards, 1925)

Subgenus Mouffetina Frey, 1942

- T. pulchricornis (Edwards, 1925)

Subgenus Trichosia Winnertz, 1867

- T. basdeni Freeman, 1983
- T. confusa Menzel & Mohrig, 1997
- T. glabra (Meigen, 1830)
- T. jenkinsoni Freeman, 1987
- T. morio (Fabricius, 1794)
- T. splendens Winnertz, 1867
