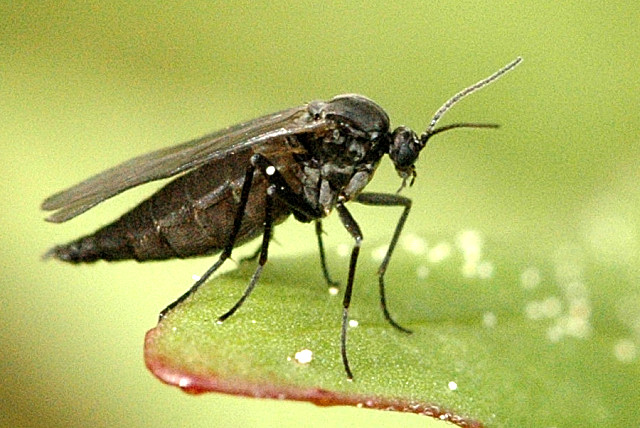
- Bradysia praecox from Commanster, in the Belgian High Ardennes

Scientific classification
- Domain: Eukaryota
- Kingdom: Animalia
- Phylum: Arthropoda
- Class: Insecta
- Order: Diptera
- Family: Sciaridae
- Genus: Bradysia; Winnertz 1867

Species
- See text

Synonyms
- Dasysciara Kieffer, 1903; Neosciara Pettey, 1918; Fungivorides Lengersdorf, 1926; Lamprosciara Frey, 1948; Paractenosciara Sasakawa, 1998

= Bradysia =

Genus of flies

Bradysia is a genus of fungus gnat in the family Sciaridae. They are commonly known as darkwinged fungus gnats. They are considered a major pest in greenhouse agriculture because they thrive in the moist conditions common inside greenhouses and feed on the plants being grown within. Bradysia is a large genus containing over 500 living species, with at least 65 species found in North America and 172 in Europe.

Bradysia species are a major pollinator of plants such as Aspidistra elatior.

== Species ==
Selected species of Bradysia include:

- B. affinis (Zetterstedt, 1838)
- B. alpicola (Winnertz, 1867)
- B. amoena (Winnertz, 1867)
- B. angustipennis (Winnertz, 1867)
- B. angustoocularis Mohrig & Krivosheina, 1989
- B. aprica (Winnertz, 7) C
- B. arcula Vilkamaa, Salmela & Hippa, 2007
- B. atracornea Mohrig & Menzel, 1992
- B. austera Menzel et al., 2006
- B. bellingeri Shaw, 1953
- B. biformis (Lundbeck, 1898)
- B. bispina (Fisher, 1938)
- B. brevispina Tuomikoski, 1960
- B. browni (Shaw, 1935)
- B. caldaria (Linyner, 1895)
- B. cellarum Frey, 1948
- B. chlorocornea Mohrig & Menzel, 1992
- B. cinerascens (Grzegorzek, 1884)
- B. confinis (Winnertz, 1867)
- B. coprophila (Lintner, 1895)
- B. cucumeris (Johannsen, 1912)
- B. cuneiforma Komarova, 1997
- B. dichaeta (Shaw, 1941)
- B. diluta (Johannsen, 1912)
- B. distincta (Staeger, 1840)
- B. dux (Johannsen, 1912)
- B. ericia (Pettey, 1918)
- B. excelsa Menzel & Mohrig, 1998
- B. expolit (Coquillett, 1900)
- B. falcata (Pettey, 1918)
- B. fatigans (Johannsen, 1912)
- B. felti (Pettey, 1918)
- B. fenestralis (Zetterstedt, 1838)
- B. flavipila Tuomikoski, 1960
- B. fochi (Pettey, 1918)
- B. forcipulata (Lundbeck, 1898)
- B. fugaca Mohrig & Mamaev, 1989
- B. fulvicauda (Felt, 1898)
- B. fumida (Johannsen, 1912)
- B. fungicola (Winnertz, 1867)
- B. giraudii (Egger, 1862)
- B. groenlandica (Holmgren, 1872)
- B. hamata (Pettey, 1918)
- B. hartii (Johannsen, 1912)
- B. hastata (Johannsen, 1912)
- B. heydemanni (Lengersdorf, 1955)
- B. hilariformis Tuomikoski, 1960
- B. hygida Sauaia & Alves, 1968
- B. impatiens (Johannsen, 1912)
- B. inusitata Tuomikoski, 1960
- B. iridipennis (Zetterstedt, 1838)
- B. ismayi Menzel et al., 2006[10]
- B. johannseni Enderlein, 1912
- B. jucunda (Johannsen, 1912)
- B. kaiseri (Shaw, 1941)
- B. lapponica (Lengersdorf, 1926)
- B. lembkei Mohrig & Menzel, 1990
- B. lobosa (Pettey, 1918)
- B. longicubitalis (Lengersdorf, 1924)
- B. longimentula Sasakawa, 1994
- B. longispina (Pettey, 1918)
- B. loriculata Mohrig, 1985
- B. macclurei (Shaw, 1941)
- B. macfarlanei (Jones, 1920)
- B. macroptera (Pettey, 1918)
- B. mellea (Johannsen, 1912)
- B. mesochra (Shaw, 1941)
- B. moesta Frey, 1948
- B. munda (Johannsen, 1912)
- B. mutua (Johannsen, 1912)
- B. neglecta (Johannsen, 1912)
- B. nemoralis (Meigen, 1818)
- B. nervosa (Meigen, 1818)
- B. nitidicollis (Meigen, 1818)
- B. nigripes (Meigen, 1830)
- B. nigrispina Menzel et al., 2006
- B. nomica Mohrig & Rsschmann, 1996
- B. normalis Frey, 1948
- B. ocellaris (Comstock, 1882)
- B. odoriphaga Yang & Zhang, 1985
- B. ovata (Pettey, 1918)
- B. pallipes (Fabricius, 1787)
- B. paradichaeta (Shaw, 1941)
- B. parilis (Johannsen, 1912)
- B. pauperata (Winnertz, 1867)
- B. pectoralis (Staeger, 1840)
- B. penna (Pettey, 1918)
- B. peraffinis Tuomikoski, 1960
- B. petaini (Pettey, 1918)
- B. picea (Rubsaamen, 1894)
- B. pilata (Pettey, 1918)
- B. placida (Winnertz, 1867)
- B. pollicis (Pettey, 1918)
- B. polonica (Lengersdorf, 1929)
- B. praecox (Meigen, 1818)
- B. procera (Winnertz, 1868)
- B. prolifica (Felt, 1898)
- B. protohilaris Mohrig & Krivosheina, 1983
- B. quadrispinistylata Alam, 1988
- B. quadrispinosa (Pettey, 1918)
- B. quadrispinosa (Pettey, 1918)
- B. reflexa Tuomikoski, 1960
- B. sachalinensis Mohrig & Krivosheina, 1989
- B. scabricornis Tuomikoski, 1960
- B. sexdentata (Pettey, 1918)
- B. silvestrii (Kieffer, 1910)
- B. similigibbosa Köhler & Menzel, 2013
- B. smithae Menzel & Heller, 2005
- B. spinata (Pettey, 1918)
- B. splendida Mohrig & Krivosheina, 1989
- B. strenua (Winnertz, 1867)
- B. strigata (Staeger, 1840)
- B. subaprica Mohrig & Krivosheina, 1989
- B. subgrandis (Shaw, 1941)
- B. subrufescens Mohrig & Krivosheina, 1989
- B. subvernalis Mohrig & Heller, 1992
- B. tilicola (Loew, 1850)
- B. trifurca (Pettey, 1918)
- B. trispinifera Mohrig & Krivosheina, 1979
- B. tritici (Coquillett, 1895)
- B. trivialis (Johannsen, 1912)
- B. trivittata (Staeger, 1840)
- B. trivittata (Staeger, 1840)
- B. unguicauda (Malloch, 1923)
- B. urticae Mohrig & Menzel, 1992
- B. vagans (Winnertz, 1868)
- B. varians (Johannsen, 1912)
- B. vernalis (Winnertz, 1868)
- B. zetterstedti Mohrig & Menzel, 1993

Data sources: C = Catalogue of Life, I = ITIS, N = NCBI
