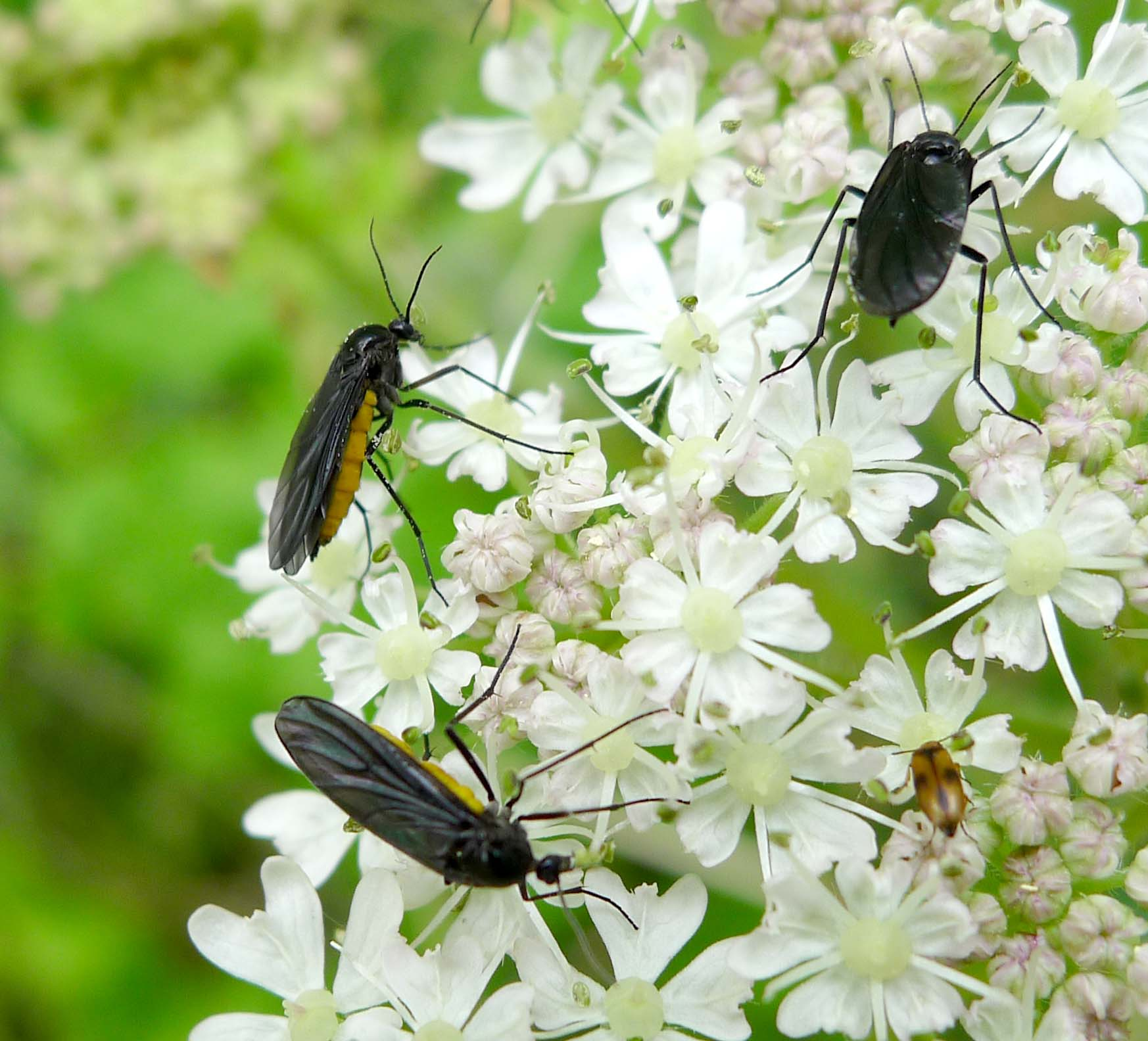

Scientific classification
- Kingdom: Animalia
- Phylum: Arthropoda
- Class: Insecta
- Order: Diptera
- Family: Sciaridae
- Genus: Sciara
- Species: S. hemerobioides

Binomial name
- Sciara hemerobioides (Scopoli, 1763)

= Sciara hemerobioides =

Species of fly

Sciara hemerobioides is a species of fly in the family Sciaridae. It is found in the Palearctic.

This species has a conspicuous yellow abdomen with a dark ventral band. It belongs to a group referred to as fungus gnats. The larvae do feed on fungi but also eat dead leaves and compost, the adults feed on nectar and can be found on umbellifers and other flowers.
