= Pnyxia =

Scientific classification
- Domain: Eukaryota
- Kingdom: Animalia
- Phylum: Arthropoda
- Class: Insecta
- Order: Diptera
- Family: Sciaridae
- Genus: Pnyxia; Johannsen, 1912

Genus of flies

Pnyxia is a genus of dark-winged fungus gnats, insects in the family Sciaridae. There are at least four described species in Pnyxia.

== Species ==
These four species belong to the genus Pnyxia:

- Pnyxia scabiei (Hopkins, 1895)^{i c g b} (potato scab gnat)
- Pnyxia schmallenbergensis Menzel & Mohrig, 1998^{g}
- Pnyxia schmallerbergensis Menzel & Mohrig, 1998^{c g}
- Pnyxia thaleri (Mohrig & Mamaev, 1978)^{c g}

Data sources: i = ITIS, c = Catalogue of Life, g = GBIF, b = Bugguide.net
