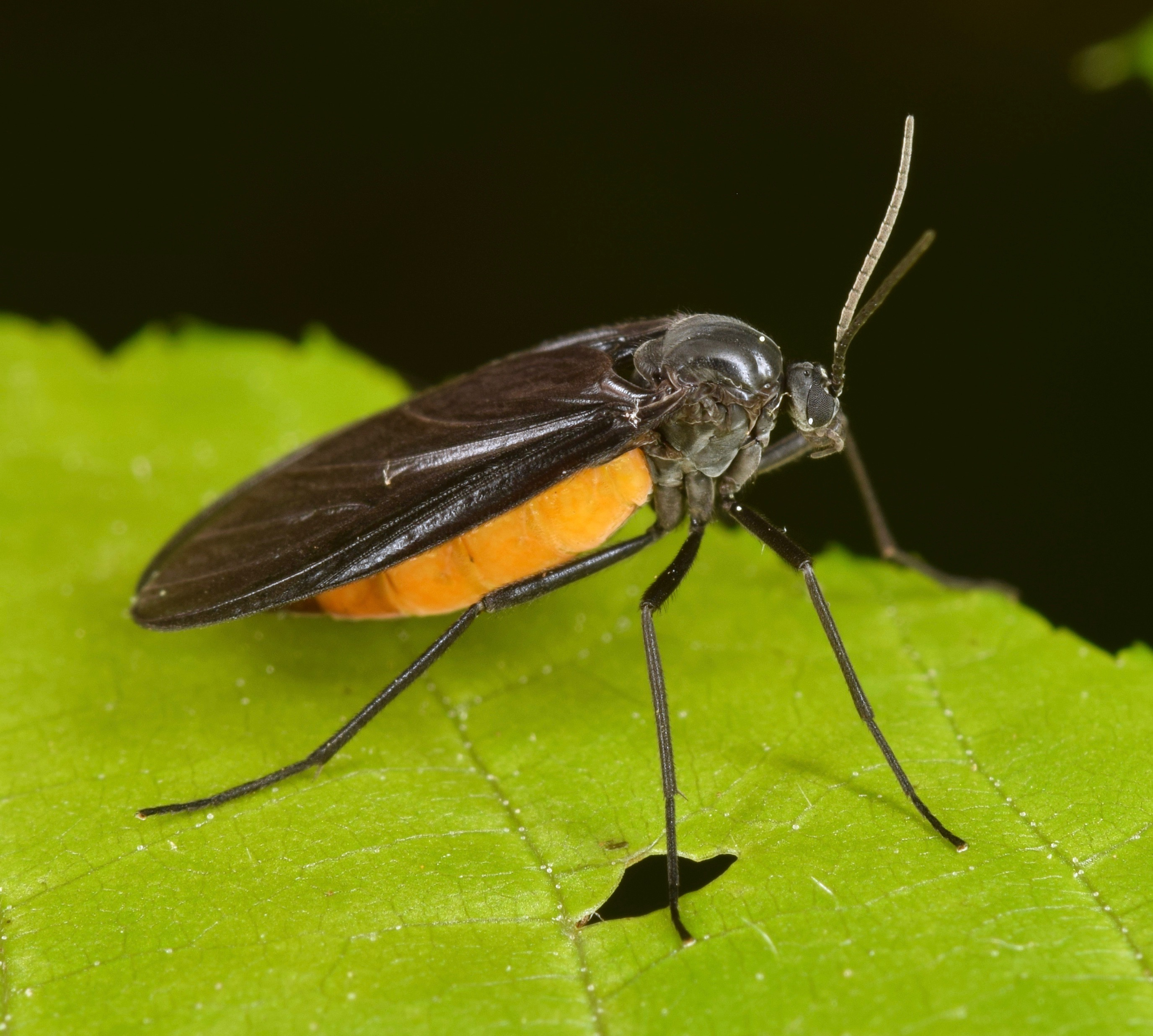
- Odontosciara nigra

Scientific classification
- Domain: Eukaryota
- Kingdom: Animalia
- Phylum: Arthropoda
- Class: Insecta
- Order: Diptera
- Family: Sciaridae
- Genus: Odontosciara; Rübsaamen, 1908

= Odontosciara =

Genus of flies

Odontosciara is a genus of dark-winged fungus gnats in the family Sciaridae. There are at least 30 described species in Odontosciara.

== Species ==
These 31 species belong to the genus Odontosciara:

- Odontosciara anodonta Yang, Zhang & Yang, 1993^{c g}
- Odontosciara beebei (Shaw & Shaw, 1950)^{c g}
- Odontosciara cyclota Yang, Zhang & Yang, 1995^{c g}
- Odontosciara dolichopoda Yang, Zhang & Yang, 1993^{c g}
- Odontosciara exacta (Brunetti, 1912)^{c g}
- Odontosciara filipes (Walker, 1865)^{c g}
- Odontosciara fimbripes Edwards, 1931^{c g}
- Odontosciara flavicingula Edwards, 1927^{c g}
- Odontosciara fruhstorferi (Rubsaamen, 1894)^{c g}
- Odontosciara fujiana Yang & Zhang, 2003^{c g}
- Odontosciara fulviventris (Wiedemann, 1821)^{c g}
- Odontosciara grandis Mohrig, 2003^{c g}
- Odontosciara impostor (Brunetti, 1912)^{c g}
- Odontosciara inconspicus (Brunetti, 1912)^{c g}
- Odontosciara lobifera Edwards, 1928^{c g}
- Odontosciara longiantenna Yang, Zhang & Yang, 1993^{c g}
- Odontosciara malayana Edwards, 1928^{c g}
- Odontosciara mirispina Yang, Zhang & Yang, 1998^{c g}
- Odontosciara nigra (Wiedemann, 1821)^{i c g b}
- Odontosciara nocta Mohrig, 2003^{c g}
- Odontosciara nyctoptera Edwards, 1931^{c g}
- Odontosciara pacifica (Edwards, 1924)^{c g}
- Odontosciara perpallida Edwards, 1925^{c g}
- Odontosciara politicollis (Edwards, 1928)^{c g}
- Odontosciara psychina (Enderlein, 1911)^{c g}
- Odontosciara pubericornis Edwards, 1928^{c g}
- Odontosciara quadrisetosa (Brunetti, 1912)^{c g}
- Odontosciara ruficoxa (Brunetti, 1912)^{c g}
- Odontosciara sexsetosa (Brunetti, 1912)^{c g}
- Odontosciara trivittigera (Edwards, 1928)^{c g}
- Odontosciara walkeri (Rubsaamen, 1894)^{c g}

Data sources: i = ITIS, c = Catalogue of Life, g = GBIF, b = Bugguide.net
