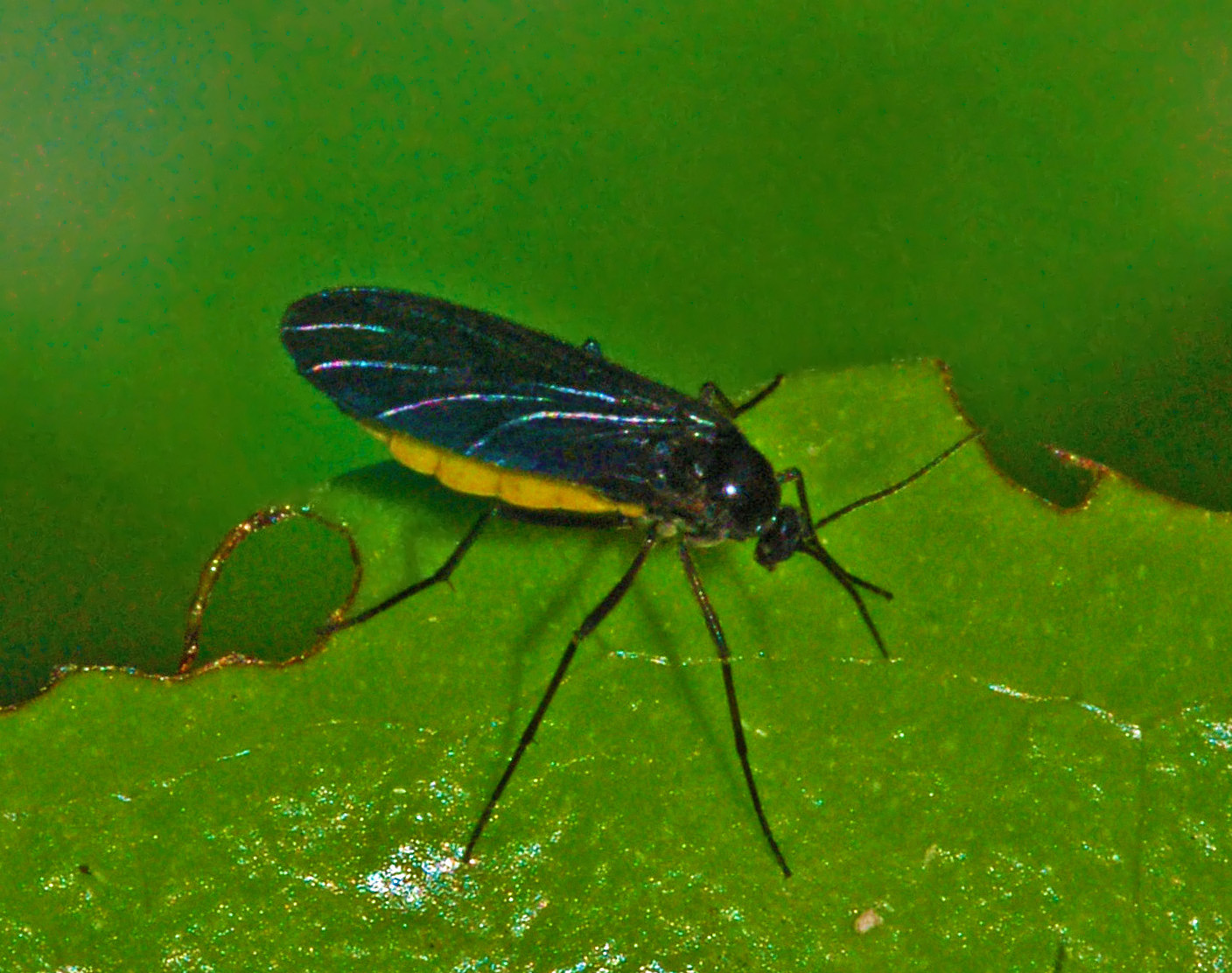
- Sciara species

Scientific classification
- Kingdom: Animalia
- Phylum: Arthropoda
- Class: Insecta
- Order: Diptera
- Family: Sciaridae
- Genus: Sciara; Meigen, 1803

Synonyms
- List: Lycoria Meigen, 1800; Molobrus Latreille, 1805; Nowickia Kjellander, 1943; Semisciara Kjellander, 1943

= Sciara (fly) =

Genus of flies

Sciara is a genus of fungus gnats in the family Sciaridae.

== Species ==
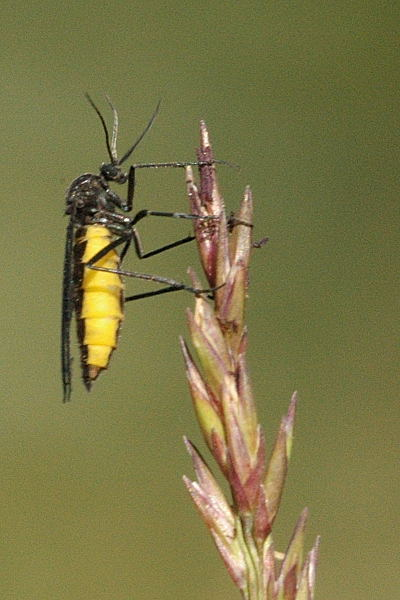
Sciara analis Schiner, 1864

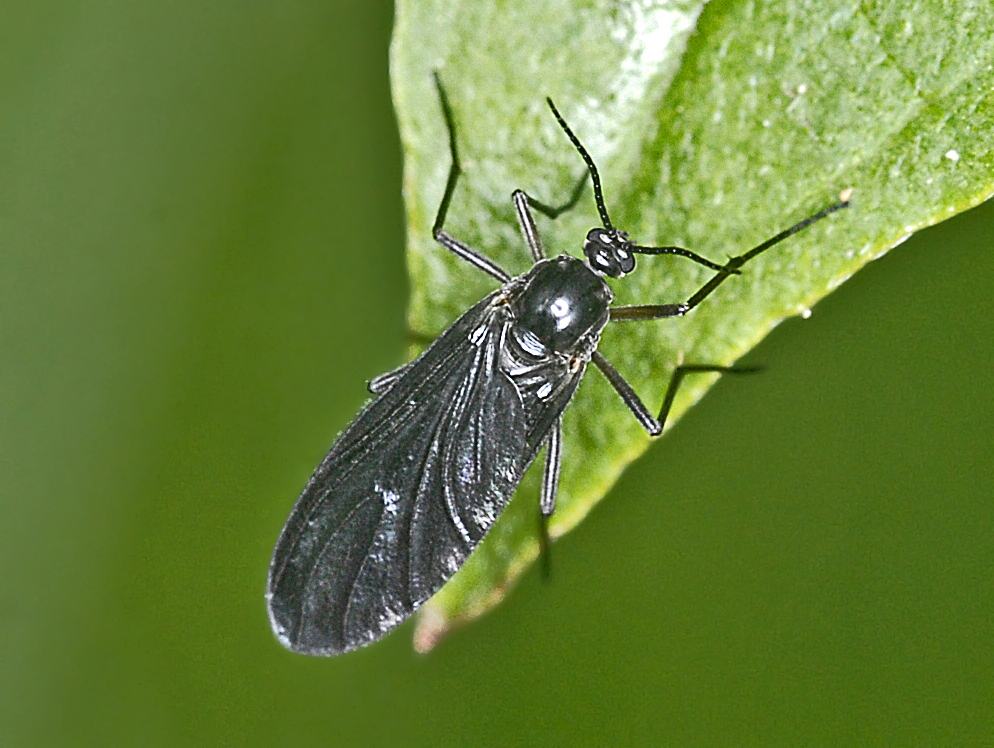
Sciara species. Dorsal view

Sciara is among the largest genus in the world, with over 700 species. Species within this genus include:

- Sciara abbreviata
- Sciara abdita
- Sciara adjuncta
- Sciara aemula
- Sciara aethiops
- Sciara africana
- Sciara albicoxa
- Sciara albifrons
- Sciara amabilis
- Sciara analis
- Sciara angustata
- Sciara antigua
- Sciara antonovae
- Sciara approximata
- Sciara aquila
- Sciara arcuata
- Sciara aspirans
- Sciara atomaria
- Sciara atrata
- Sciara atratula
- Sciara atrifrons
- Sciara attenuata
- Sciara audax
- Sciara aurosa
- Sciara barnardi
- Sciara biformata
- Sciara bispinosa
- Sciara borealis
- Sciara brevifurca
- Sciara brevipetiolata
- Sciara bullastylata
- Sciara cameronensis
- Sciara capensis
- Sciara cavicata
- Sciara cingulata
- Sciara clavata
- Sciara colorata
- Sciara columbiana
- Sciara compacta
- Sciara concinna
- Sciara confusa
- Sciara congregata
- Sciara conjuncta
- Sciara consanguinea
- Sciara contermina
- Sciara conulifera
- Sciara convergens
- Sciara copiosa
- Sciara coprophila
- Sciara costalis
- Sciara costata
- Sciara crassicornis
- Sciara curvinervis
- Sciara cylindrica
- Sciara delessei
- Sciara denticornis
- Sciara diacantha
- Sciara diderma
- Sciara differens
- Sciara dimidiata
- Sciara diminutiva
- Sciara diota
- Sciara dissimilis
- Sciara distigma
- Sciara distinguenda
- Sciara divergens
- Sciara diversa
- Sciara diversipes
- Sciara dives
- Sciara dolicholabis
- Sciara dolosa
- Sciara erratica
- Sciara esuriens
- Sciara evanescens
- Sciara exigua
- Sciara exilis
- Sciara exposita
- Sciara exsequialis
- Sciara familiaris
- Sciara fasciata
- Sciara fascipennis
- Sciara femoralis
- Sciara femorata
- Sciara festina
- Sciara festiva
- Sciara finitima
- Sciara flammiventris
- Sciara flavicollis
- Sciara flavicoxis
- Sciara flavimana
- Sciara flavipeura
- Sciara flaviseta
- Sciara flavofemorata
- Sciara flavomarginata
- Sciara flavoscutellata
- Sciara fletcherae
- Sciara foliorum
- Sciara fratercula
- Sciara fraterna
- Sciara frequens
- Sciara froggatti
- Sciara fuliginosus
- Sciara fumipennis
- Sciara funebris
- Sciara fuscipennis
- Sciara fuscolimbata
- Sciara futilis
- Sciara globosa
- Sciara griseicollis
- Sciara grzegorseki
- Sciara habilis
- Sciara hebes
- Sciara helmsi
- Sciara helvola
- Sciara hemerobioides
- Sciara hendersoni
- Sciara heteroptera
- Sciara heteropus
- Sciara hirtilineata
- Sciara hirtilineatoides
- Sciara horrescens
- Sciara humeralis
- Sciara hyalinata
- Sciara ignobilis
- Sciara incerta
- Sciara inconstans
- Sciara indica
- Sciara infantula
- Sciara infirma
- Sciara infixa
- Sciara infrequens
- Sciara isarthria
- Sciara isopalpi
- Sciara jacobsoni
- Sciara japonica
- Sciara jeanneli
- Sciara karnyi
- Sciara khasiensis
- Sciara kinabaluana
- Sciara kitakamiensis
- Sciara lackschewitzi
- Sciara lamprina
- Sciara latelineata
- Sciara latipons
- Sciara leucocera
- Sciara ligniperda
- Sciara longipes
- Sciara lucidipennis
- Sciara lucipeta
- Sciara luctifica
- Sciara luculenta
- Sciara lumuensis
- Sciara lurida
- Sciara luteiventris
- Sciara luteolamellata
- Sciara macleayi
- Sciara maculithorax
- Sciara maesta
- Sciara mahensis
- Sciara maolana
- Sciara marcilla
- Sciara marginalis
- Sciara marginata
- Sciara mediofusca
- Sciara medullaris
- Sciara melaleuca
- Sciara melanostyla
- Sciara mendax
- Sciara microtricha
- Sciara migrator
- Sciara militaris
- Sciara militarsis
- Sciara minutela
- Sciara modesta
- Sciara monacantha
- Sciara montivaga
- Sciara multispinulosa
- Sciara nemoralis
- Sciara neorufescens
- Sciara nepalensis
- Sciara nigrans
- Sciara nigrifemur
- Sciara nigripennis
- Sciara nigripes
- Sciara nigrita
- Sciara nigropicea
- Sciara nitidithorax
- Sciara nitulina
- Sciara nivata
- Sciara niveiapicalis
- Sciara nivicola
- Sciara notata
- Sciara nowickii
- Sciara nubicula
- Sciara ochrolabis
- Sciara opposita
- Sciara ornatula
- Sciara pahangensis
- Sciara pakkana
- Sciara pallescens
- Sciara palliceps
- Sciara parallela
- Sciara patricii
- Sciara pectilinealis
- Sciara penicillata
- Sciara pernitida
- Sciara perpusilla
- Sciara philippinensis
- Sciara philpotti
- Sciara pictipes
- Sciara polita
- Sciara politula
- Sciara praescellens
- Sciara prominens
- Sciara promiscua
- Sciara pruinosa
- Sciara psittacus
- Sciara pubescens
- Sciara pulicaria
- Sciara pycnacantha
- Sciara pygmaea
- Sciara quadrimaculata
- Sciara ratana
- Sciara reciproca
- Sciara recondita
- Sciara recta
- Sciara remyi
- Sciara rimiscutellata
- Sciara robusta
- Sciara rotunda
- Sciara rotundipennis
- Sciara rufa
- Sciara ruficauda
- Sciara satiata
- Sciara schmidbergeri
- Sciara schultzei
- Sciara sciastica
- Sciara sciophila
- Sciara scita
- Sciara scitula
- Sciara sclerocerci
- Sciara sedula
- Sciara segetum
- Sciara segmenticornis
- Sciara selangoriana
- Sciara selecta
- Sciara selliformis
- Sciara septentrionalis
- Sciara serenipennis
- Sciara sericata
- Sciara setilineata
- Sciara seychellensis
- Sciara simulator
- Sciara singhalensis
- Sciara sororia
- Sciara speciosa
- Sciara spectabilis
- Sciara speculum
- Sciara stigmatopleura
- Sciara suavis
- Sciara subfascipennis
- Sciara subrunnipes
- Sciara sumatrana
- Sciara tenompokensis
- Sciara tepperi
- Sciara tetraleuca
- Sciara thomsoni
- Sciara thoracica
- Sciara townesi
- Sciara transpacifica
- Sciara trileucarthra
- Sciara tryoni
- Sciara turrida
- Sciara uichancoi
- Sciara ulrichi
- Sciara unica
- Sciara unicolor
- Sciara unicorn
- Sciara varipes
- Sciara vecors
- Sciara vicina
- Sciara winnertzi
- Sciara viridipes
- Sciara womersleyi
- Sciara vulgaris
- Sciara vulpina
- Sciara xizangana
- Sciara yadongana
- Sciara zalampra
- Sciara zealandica
- Sciara zygocera

== Description ==
The adult fly is small, up to 3 mm, has a dark brown body, small head and its legs and wings are comparatively long, looking like a mosquito.

=== Biology ===
These insects feed on decaying organic matter and fungi. They are often found in greenhouses. Their larvae are up to 6 mm long, white, slender and legless, with a black head and smooth semi-transparent skin which reveals the contents of the digestive tract.

Sex determination in Sciara is a different mechanism. Sciara has 4 pairs of chromosomes: 3 pairs of autosomes and one pair of allosomes. Some special chromosomes called limited chromosomes are present in certain stages. The zygote has 3 pairs of autosomes a one or more limited chromosomes and 3 X chromosome (2 fathers’, 1 mother's). There are 2 stages in Sciara: the Germ line and the Soma line.

==== Germ line ====
The Germ line is the gametic line where the gamete formation takes place. The number of chromosomes during this line is different in males and females.

In the formation sperms of males the 1st spermatocystic division is monocentric mitosis, the maternal and paternal homologous chromosomes are separated. Then few limited chromosomes are eliminated not all of them. After this one paternal X chromosome is also eliminated. Hence male germ line (spermatogonia) cells have 3 pairs of autosomes, 2 (one maternal and one paternal) X chromosomes and a few limited chromosomes.

In the formation ova of the females the 1st ovarian division is monocentric mitosis, the maternal and paternal homologous chromosomes are separated. Then few limited chromosomes are eliminated not all of them. After this both 2 paternal X chromosome are also eliminated. Hence female germ line (oogonia) cells have 3 pairs of autosomes, 1 maternal X chromosomes and a few limited chromosomes.

==== Soma line ====
Soma line is the vegetative stage. During early cleavage stages of the embryo, limited chromosomes are eliminated. The number of chromosomes during this line is different in males and females.

In males during the 5th and 6th divisions of the embryo all the limited chromosomes are eliminated. Then paternal X chromosome is eliminated which are 2 in number. Hence male soma line cells have 3 pairs of autosomes and one maternal X chromosome.

In the females during the 5th and 6th divisions of the embryo all the limited chromosomes are eliminated. In the next stage of cleavage one paternal X chromosome is eliminated. Hence female soma line cells have 3 pairs of autosomes and one maternal and one paternal X chromosome.

== Bibliography ==
- Pettey, F. W., 1918. A revision of the genus Sciara of the family Mycetophilidae (Diptera). Ann. Ent. Soc. America, vol. 11 no. 4.
- Ruiz MF et al. - An Unusual Role for doublesex in Sex Determination in the Dipteran Sciara- Genetics. (2015)
- Vilkamaa P et al - The genus Sciara Meigen (Diptera, Sciaridae) in New Caledonia, with the description of two new species - Zootaxa. (2015)
