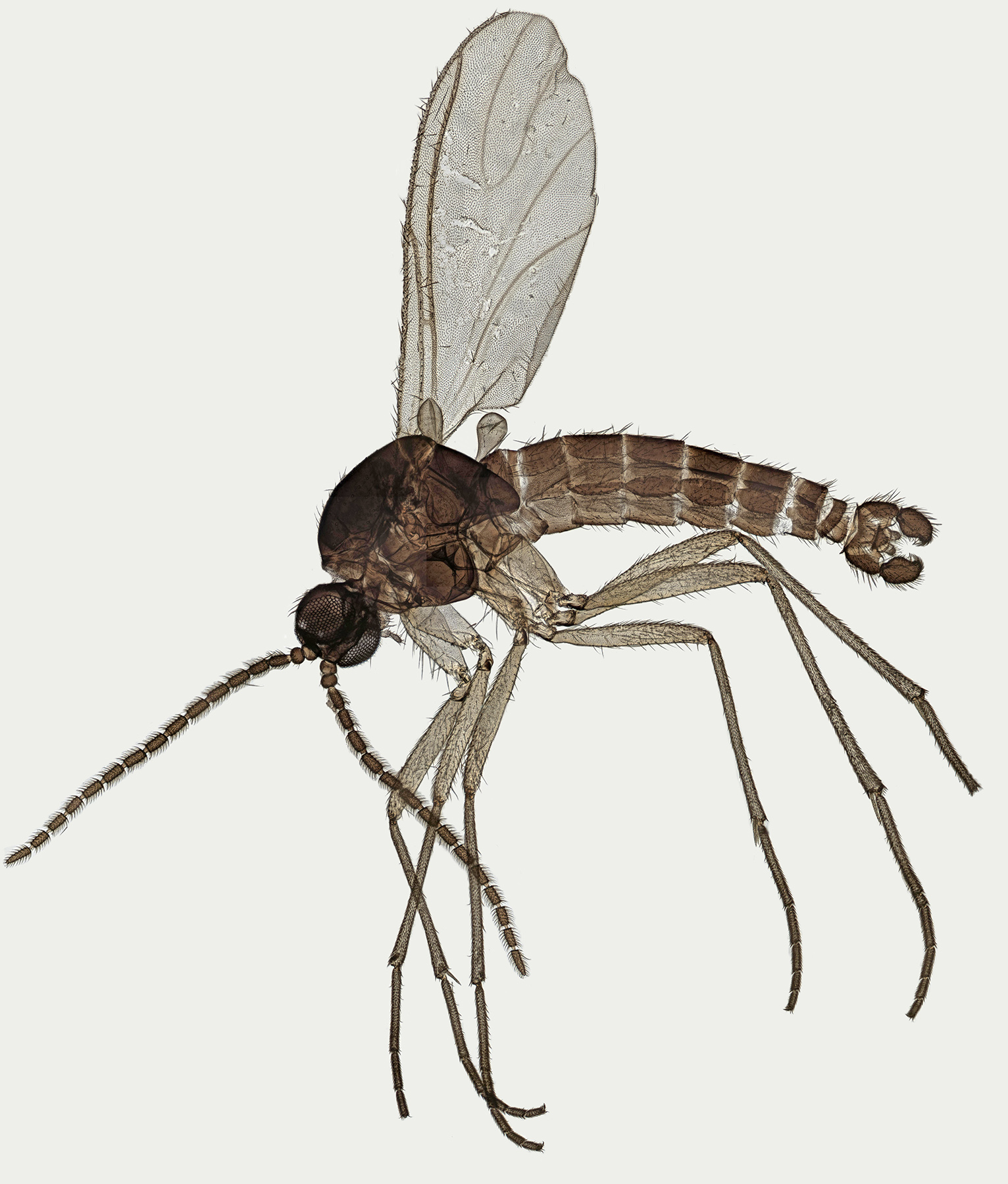
- Corynoptera forcipata

Scientific classification
- Domain: Eukaryota
- Kingdom: Animalia
- Phylum: Arthropoda
- Class: Insecta
- Order: Diptera
- Family: Sciaridae
- Genus: Corynoptera; Winnertz, 1867

= Corynoptera =

Genus of flies

Corynoptera is a genus of fungus gnats in the family Sciaridae.

== Species ==
- Corynoptera abducera Mohrig & Rulik, 1999
- Corynoptera adustula Hippa, Vilkamaa & Heller, 2010
- Corynoptera aequispina Hippa, Vilkamaa & Heller, 2010
- Corynoptera alneti Hippa, Vilkamaa & Heller, 2010
- Corynoptera alticola (Kieffer, 1919)
- Corynoptera anae Mohrig & Heller, 1992
- Corynoptera andalusica Hippa, Vilkamaa & Heller, 2010
- Corynoptera angustior Hippa, Vilkamaa & Heller, 2010
- Corynoptera anodon Hippa, Vilkamaa & Heller, 2010
- Corynoptera applanata Mohrig & Dimitrova, 1992
- Corynoptera arboris Fritz, 1982
- Corynoptera badia Hippa, Vilkamaa & Heller, 2010
- Corynoptera bernardoensis Mohrig & Röschmann, 1993
- Corynoptera bicuspidata (Lengersdorf, 1926)
- Corynoptera bipartita Mohrig & Krivosheina, 1985
- Corynoptera bistrispina (Bukowski & Lengersdorf, 1936)
- Corynoptera boletiphaga (Lengersdorf, 1940)
- Corynoptera breviformis Mohrig & Krivosheina, 1983
- Corynoptera caesula Hippa & Menzel
- Corynoptera caustica Mohrig & Röschmann, 1996
- Corynoptera chaetospina Mohrig & Röschmann, 1996
- Corynoptera cincinnata Mohrig & Blasco-Zumeta, 1996
- Corynoptera collicola Hippa, Vilkamaa & Heller, 2010
- Corynoptera condyloma Hippa, Vilkamaa & Heller, 2010
- Corynoptera confirmata Mohrig, 1985
- Corynoptera consumpta (Freeman, 1987)
- Corynoptera controversa Hippa, Vilkamaa & Heller, 2010
- Corynoptera contusa Mohrig, 1994
- Corynoptera curvapex Hippa, Vilkamaa & Heller, 2010
- Corynoptera curvispinosa Freeman, 1983
- Corynoptera decepta Hippa, Vilkamaa & Heller, 2010
- Corynoptera defecta (Frey, 1948)
- Corynoptera digemina Hippa, Vilkamaa & Heller, 2010
- Corynoptera diligenta Rudzinski, 2008
- Corynoptera dioon Hippa, Vilkamaa & Heller, 2010
- Corynoptera distenta Hippa, Vilkamaa & Heller, 2010
- Corynoptera dubitata Tuomikoski, 1960
- Corynoptera elegans Bischoff de Alzuet & Naijt, 1973
- Corynoptera exerta Hippa, Vilkamaa & Heller, 2010
- Corynoptera fimbriata Hippa, Vilkamaa & Heller, 2010
- Corynoptera flava Hippa, Vilkamaa & Heller, 2010
- Corynoptera flavicauda (Zetterstedt, 1855)
- Corynoptera flavosignata Menzel & Heller, 2006
- Corynoptera forcipata (Winnertz, 1867)
- Corynoptera francescae Mohrig & Kauschke, 1994
- Corynoptera furcifera Mohrig & Mamaev, 1987
- Corynoptera gemellata Hippa, Vilkamaa & Heller, 2010
- Corynoptera grothae Mohrig & Menzel, 1990
- Corynoptera hemiacantha Mohrig & Mamaev, 1992
- Corynoptera hypopygialis (Lengersdorf, 1926)
- Corynoptera iberica Hippa, Vilkamaa & Heller, 2010
- Corynoptera inclinata Hippa, Vilkamaa & Heller, 2010
- Corynoptera inexspectata Tuomikoski, 1960
- Corynoptera irmgardis (Lengersdorf, 1930)
- Corynoptera karlkulbei Mohrig & Röschmann, 1996
- Corynoptera latibula Hippa & Menzel
- Corynoptera levis Tuomikoski, 1960
- Corynoptera lobata Hippa, Vilkamaa & Heller, 2010
- Corynoptera luteofusca (Bukowski & Lengersdorf, 1936)
- Corynoptera macricula Mohrig & Krivosheina, 1986
- Corynoptera marinae Mohrig & Krivosheina, 1986
- Corynoptera mediana Mohrig & Mamaev, 1982
- Corynoptera melanochaeta Mohrig & Menzel, 1992
- Corynoptera membranigera (Kieffer, 1903)
- Corynoptera micula Hippa, Vilkamaa & Heller, 2010
- Corynoptera minax Hippa, Vilkamaa & Heller, 2010
- Corynoptera minima (Meigen, 1818)
- Corynoptera montana (Winnertz, 1869)
- Corynoptera nigrocauda Mohrig and Menzel, 1990
- Corynoptera ninae Hippa, Vilkamaa & Heller, 2010
- Corynoptera pacifica Hippa, Vilkamaa & Heller, 2010
- Corynoptera paracantha Hippa, Vilkamaa & Heller, 2010
- Corynoptera parcitata Mohrig & Mamaev, 1986
- Corynoptera patula Hippa, Vilkamaa & Heller, 2010
- Corynoptera perornata Mohrig & Röschmann, 1993
- Corynoptera perpusilla Winnertz, 1867
- Corynoptera phili Hippa, Vilkamaa & Heller, 2010
- Corynoptera plusiochaeta Hippa, Vilkamaa & Heller, 2010
- Corynoptera polana Rudzinski, 2009
- Corynoptera praefurcifera Mohrig, 1994
- Corynoptera praevia (Mohrig & Menzel, 1992)
- Corynoptera primoriensis Hippa, Vilkamaa & Heller, 2010
- Corynoptera redunca Hippa, Vilkamaa & Heller, 2010
- Corynoptera roeschmanni Mohrig & Rulik, 2001
- Corynoptera romana Hippa, Vilkamaa & Heller, 2010
- Corynoptera saccata Tuomikoski, 1960
- Corynoptera saetistyla Mohrig & Krivosheina, 1985
- Corynoptera sedula Mohrig & Krivosheina, 1985
- Corynoptera semipedestris Mohrig & Blasco-Zumeta, 1996
- Corynoptera semisaccata Mohrig & Mamaev, 1987
- Corynoptera serotina Hippa, Vilkamaa & Heller, 2010
- Corynoptera setosa Freeman, 1983
- Corynoptera sinedens Hippa, Vilkamaa & Heller, 2010
- Corynoptera sphaerula Hippa, Vilkamaa & Heller, 2010
- Corynoptera sphenoptera Tuomikoski, 1960
- Corynoptera spiciceps Hippa, Vilkamaa & Heller, 2010
- Corynoptera spicigera Hippa, Vilkamaa & Heller, 2010
- Corynoptera stellaris Hippa, Vilkamaa & Heller, 2010
- Corynoptera stipidaria Mohrig, 1994
- Corynoptera subclinochaeta Hippa, Vilkamaa & Heller, 2010
- Corynoptera subfurcifera Mohrig & Hövemeyer, 1992
- Corynoptera subpiniphila Mohrig & Mamaev, 1992
- Corynoptera subsaccata Mohrig & Krivosheina, 1982
- Corynoptera subsedula Mohrig & Mamaev, 1987
- Corynoptera subtetrachaeta Komarova, 1995
- Corynoptera subtilis (Lengersdorf, 1929)
- Corynoptera syriaca (Lengersdorf, 1934)
- Corynoptera tarda Hippa, Vilkamaa & Heller, 2010
- Corynoptera tetrachaeta Tuomikoski, 1960
- Corynoptera tiliacea Komarova, 2000
- Corynoptera trepida (Winnertz, 1867)
- Corynoptera triacantha Tuomikoski, 1960
- Corynoptera trichistylis Hippa, Vilkamaa & Heller, 2010
- Corynoptera tridentata Hondru, 1968
- Corynoptera truncatula Hippa, Vilkamaa & Heller, 2010
- Corynoptera tumidula Hippa, Vilkamaa & Heller, 2010
- Corynoptera turkmenica Antonova, 1975
- Corynoptera umbrata Hippa & Menzel
- Corynoptera uncata Menzel & Smith, 2006
- Corynoptera uncinula Hippa, Vilkamaa & Heller, 2010
- Corynoptera undulosa Hippa & Menzel
- Corynoptera voluptuosa Mohrig & Mamaev, 1987
- Corynoptera vulcani Hippa, Vilkamaa & Heller, 2010
- Corynoptera waltraudis Mohrig & Mamaev, 1987
- Corynoptera warnckei Rudzinski, 2006
