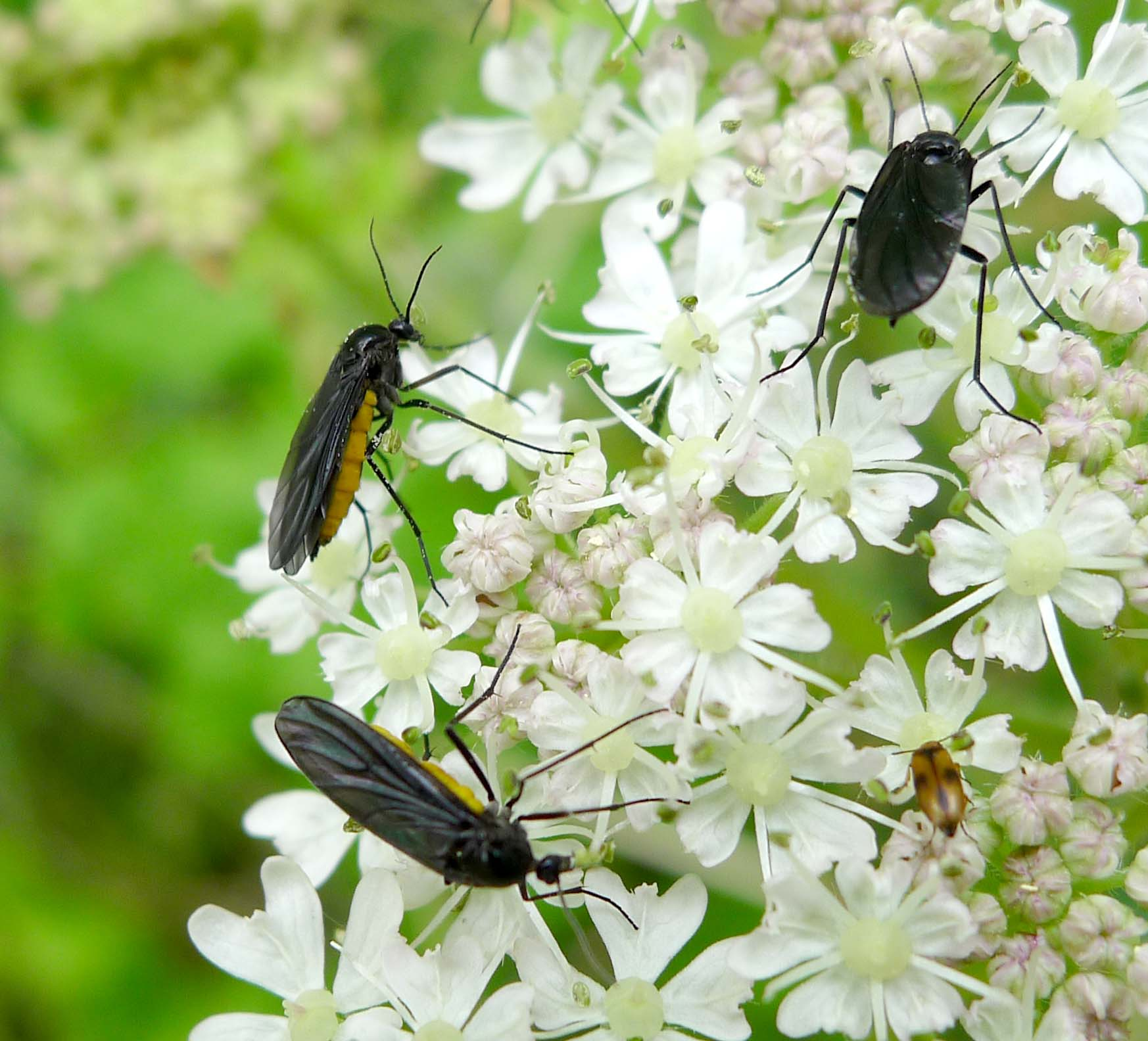
- Sciara hemerobioides

Scientific classification
- Domain: Eukaryota
- Kingdom: Animalia
- Phylum: Arthropoda
- Class: Insecta
- Order: Diptera
- Superfamily: Sciaroidea
- Family: Sciaridae; Billberg, 1820

Diversity
- at least 90 genera

= Sciaridae =

Family of flies

A sciarid ovipositing into a leaf of Urtica

The Sciaridae are a family of flies, commonly known as dark-winged fungus gnats. Commonly found in moist environments, they are known to be a pest of mushroom farms and are commonly found in household plant pots. This is one of the least studied of the large Diptera families, probably due to the small size of these insects and the similarity among species.

Currently, around 1700 species are described, but an estimated 20,000 species are awaiting discovery, mainly in the tropics. More than 600 species are known from Europe.

== Description ==
Adult Sciaridae are small, dark flies 1–11 mm long and usually <5 mm long. They have a characteristic wing venation: there is no cross vein except for a short rs at the wing base, the anterior veins are a short R1 and a long R5, vein M has a simple fork with a long stem, and CuA1 has a fork with a short stem.

Larval Sciaridae are slender and lack legs. They are white except for a black head, and their skin is slightly transparent so the contents of the gut are visible. The abdominal creeping welts lack sclerotised spicules; this differentiates Sciaridae from the related family Mycetophilidae, in which sclerotised spicules are present.

== Distribution ==
The Sciaridae occur worldwide, even in extreme habitats such as subantarctic islands and mountainous regions above 4,000 m. Others (such as Parapnyxia) are found in deserts, where they dig into the sand at extreme temperatures. Several species live exclusively in caves. However, most species live in forests, swamps, and moist meadows, where they live in the foliage. They are also often found in flowerpots. In moist and shadowy areas, up to 70% of all dipteran species can be Sciaridae.

They are distributed through wind and drifting, for example on dead wood, and are often introduced by humans, by means of transported humus or similar.

== Life cycle ==
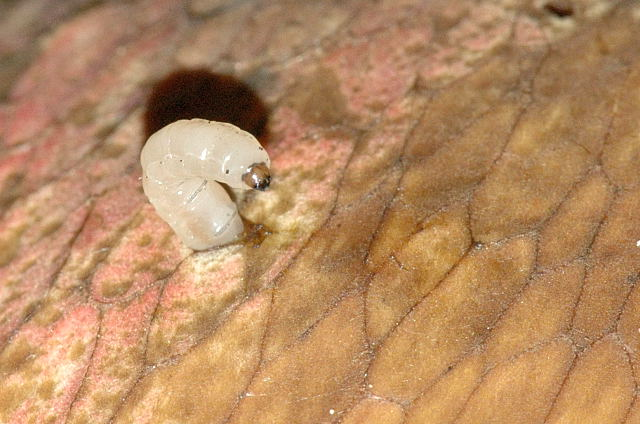
Sciarid larva

The life cycle of only a few species has been studied in any detail, mainly those which are pests of commercially grown mushrooms. Sciarid larvae often occur in decaying plant matter such as rotten wood or under the bark of fallen trees, but can also be found in animal feces or fungi. The species Austrosciara termitophila is an inquiline in termite nests while the genus Vulagisciara is a guest in ant-plants of family Rubiaceae. Also, some species mine in plant parts above and below the earth. The larvae play an important role in turning forest leaf litter into soil.

Adult females lay about 200 transparent eggs (each about 1 mm; 1/32" long) into moist soil. After about one week, the larvae hatch. About 90% of the larvae are female. Up to 2,500 per m² (230 per sq. ft.) can be found. Several species, especially Sciara militaris, can be found to migrate in processions of up to 10 metres, containing thousands of individuals. These processions occur from May to June in central Europe. Occurrences have been reported e.g. in Southern Poland, the Polish name of the phenomenon is "pleń". The larvae there pupate from July to August.

The adults with their characteristic dancing flight do not bite. They only ingest liquids and live only long enough to mate and produce eggs. They die after about five days.

== Mating and genetics ==
Sciaridae practice paternal genome elimination, whereby the male passes on only the genetic material of his mother to his offspring. The functional result of this is similar to haplodiploidy, but via a very different mechanism.

== Evolution ==
Sciarids are fairly common in amber deposits, with the earliest known fossils dating from the Cretaceous period.

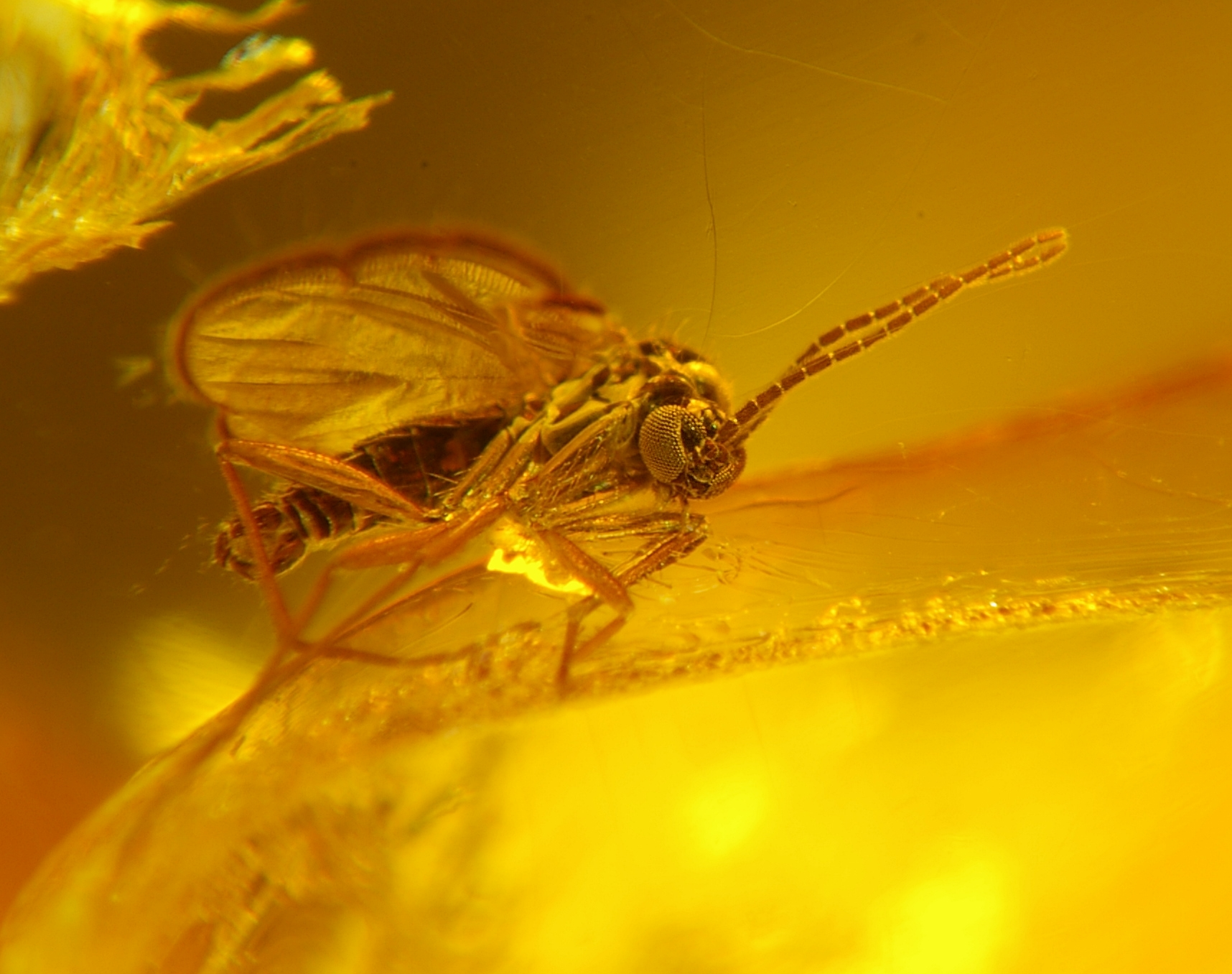
Sciarid fly in amber

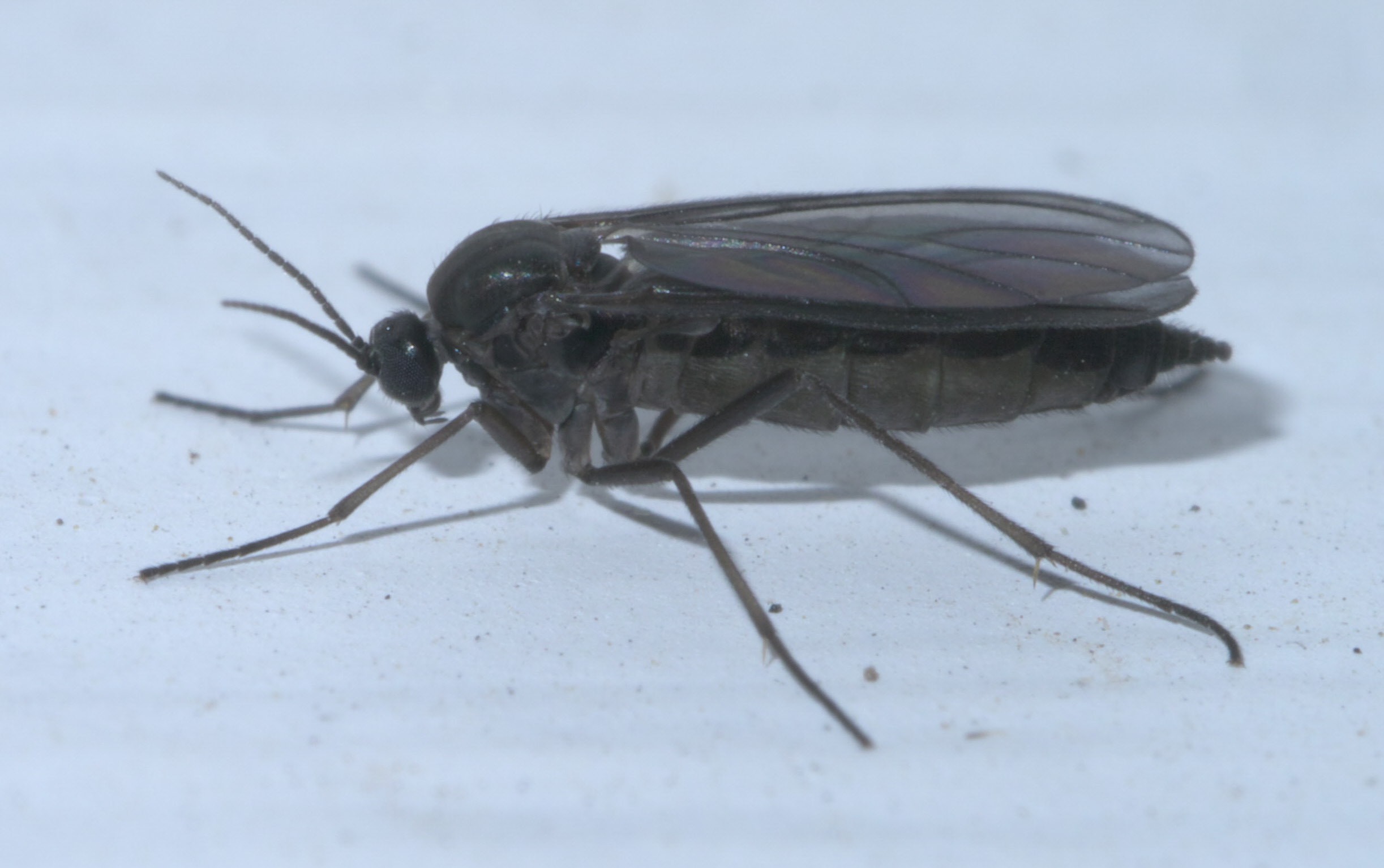
Dark-winged fungus gnat, Sciaridae

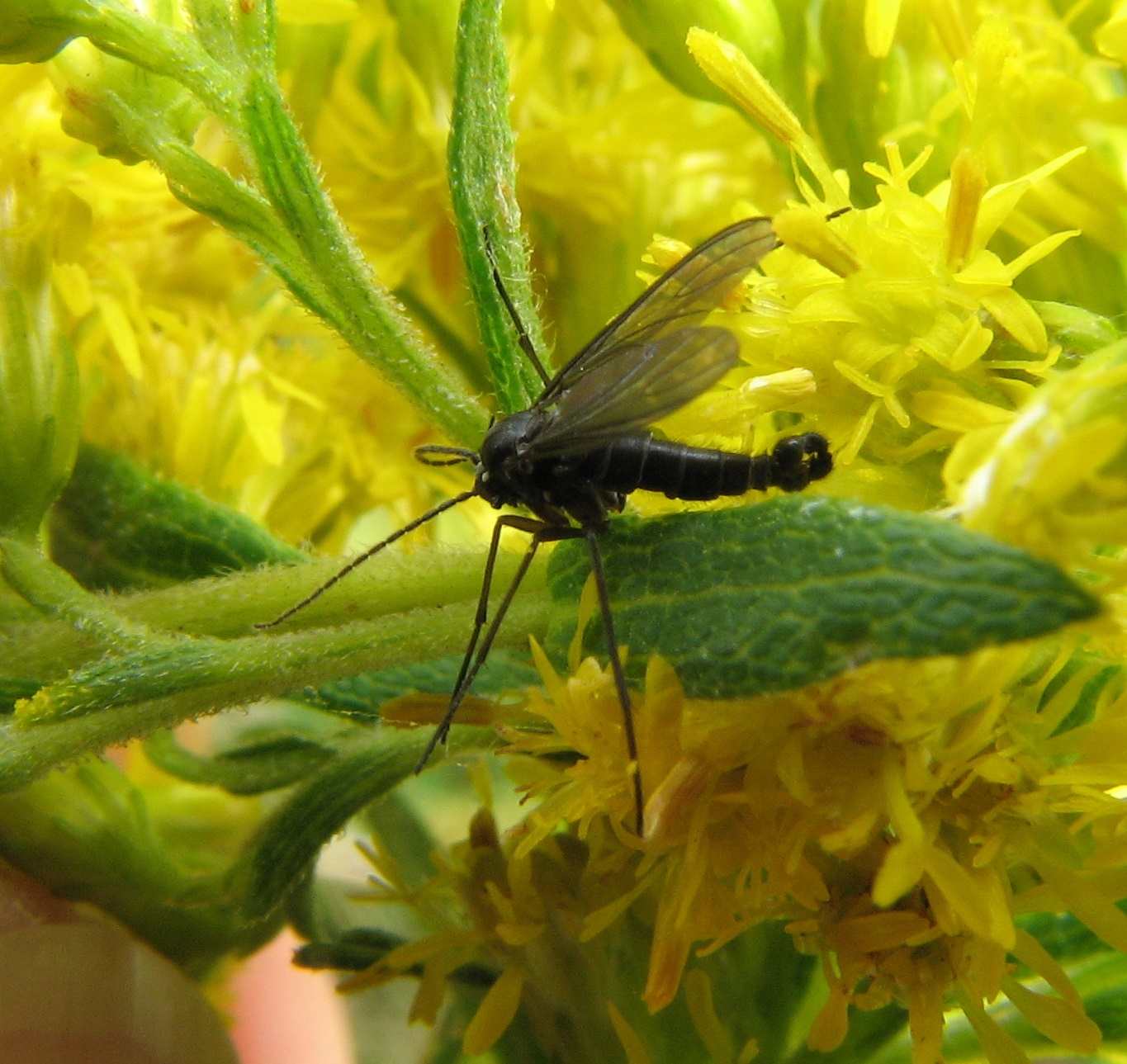
Dark-winged fungus gnat, Sciaridae, male

== Pest status ==
Sciarid flies are common pests of mushroom houses and of plants grown in protected culture, for example herbs, where the warm and moist conditions favour their rapid development. In commercial mushroom houses, sciarid fly larvae tunnel into the stalks of the mushrooms, and feeding damage can sever developing mycelium, causing mushrooms to become brown and leathery. Their faeces may also prevent the mycelium from colonising the casing layer, severely reducing yields. As a pest of plants, sciarid larvae feed on the root system. In both industries, adult sciarid flies are a nuisance pest that can result in crop rejection if high numbers are present in the growing area.

The damaging larval stage can be controlled using the beneficial nematode Steinernema feltiae, which enters the larva and releases a bacterium (Xenorhabdus sp.) that kills the insect. The nematode then reproduces within the larva and its young are released into the growing medium, where they actively search out new host larvae (infective juveniles).

== See also ==
- Fungus gnat
- Lasthenia conjugens
- List of Sciaridae genera
