= Mastinocerinae =

Scientific classification
- Kingdom: Animalia
- Phylum: Arthropoda
- Class: Insecta
- Order: Coleoptera
- Suborder: Polyphaga
- Infraorder: Elateriformia
- Family: Phengodidae
- Subfamily: Mastinocerinae; LeConte, 1881

Genera
- Many, see text

Subfamily of beetles

The Mastinocerinae are a subfamily of phengodid beetles (Phengodidae). It contains mostly Central and South American species. They are also known as "railroad worms".

== Genera ==
- Akamboja Roza, Quintino, Mermudes & Silveira, 2017, 5 spp.
- Brasilocerus Wittmer, 1963, 9 spp.
- Cenophengus LeConte, 1881, 23 spp.
- Cephalophrixothrix Wittmer, 1976, 3 spp.
- Decamastinocerus Wittmer, 1988, 2 spp.
- Distremocephalus Wittmer, 1976, 11 spp.
- Eurymastinocerus Wittmer, 1976, 8 spp.
- Euryognathus Wittmer, 1976, 2 spp.
- Euryopa Gorham, 1881, 8 spp.
- Howdenia Wittmer, 1976, 10 spp.
- Iviephengus Roza, 2023, 1 sp.
- Mastinocerus Solier, 1849
  - subgenus Mastinocerus Solier, 1849, 18 spp.
  - subgenus Paramastinocerus Wittmer, 1976, 8 spp.
- Mastinomorphus Wittmer, 1976, 15 spp.
- Mastinowittmerus Zaragoza-Caballero, 1984, 2 spp.
- Neophengus Wittmer, 1976, 3 spp.
- Nephromma Wittmer, 1976, 2 spp.
- Oxymastinocerus Wittmer, 1963, 9 spp.
- Paraphrixothrix Zaragoza-Caballero, 2010, 1 sp.
- Paraptorthodius Schaeffer, 1904, 3 spp.
- Phrixothrix Olivier, 1909, 17 spp.
- Pseudomastinocerus Wittmer, 1963, 9 spp.
- Ptorthodiellus Wittmer, 1976, 2 spp.
- Ptorthodius Gorham, 1881, 3 spp.
- Spangleriella Wittmer, 1988, 1 sp.
- Steneuryopa Wittmer, 1986, 1 sp.
- Stenophrixothrix Wittmer, 1963, 19 spp.
- Taximastinocerus Wittmer, 1963, 18 spp.
