= Mastinocerini =

Scientific classification
- Domain: Eukaryota
- Kingdom: Animalia
- Phylum: Arthropoda
- Class: Insecta
- Order: Coleoptera
- Suborder: Polyphaga
- Infraorder: Elateriformia
- Family: Phengodidae
- Subfamily: Phengodinae
- Tribe: Mastinocerini

Genera
- See text

Tribe of beetles

Mastinocerini is a tribe of beetles in the family Phengodidae. There are at least 190 described species in Mastinocerini.

== Genera ==
- Astraptor Murray, 1868
- Brasilocerus Wittmer, 1963
- Cenophengus LeConte, 1861
- Cephalophrixothrix Wittmer, 1976
- Decamastinocerus Wittmer, 1988
- Distremocephalus Wittmer, 1976
- Eurymastinocerus Wittmer, 1976
- Euryognathus Wittmer, 1976
- Euryopa Gorham, 1881
- Howdenia Wittmer, 1976
- Mastinocerus Solier, 1849
- Mastinomorphus Wittmer, 1976
- Mastinowittmerus Zaragoza, 1984
- Neophengus Wittmer, 1976
- Nephromma Wittmer, 1976
- Oxymastinocerus Wittmer, 1963
- Paraptorthodius Schaeffer, 1904
- Phrixothrix E. Olivier, 1909
- Pseudomastinocerus Wittmer, 1963
- Ptorthodiellus Wittmer, 1976
- Ptorthodius Gorham, 1881
- Spangleriella Wittmer, 1988
- Steneuryopa Wittmer, 1986
- Stenophrixothrix Wittmer, 1963
- Taximastinocerus Wittmer, 1963
