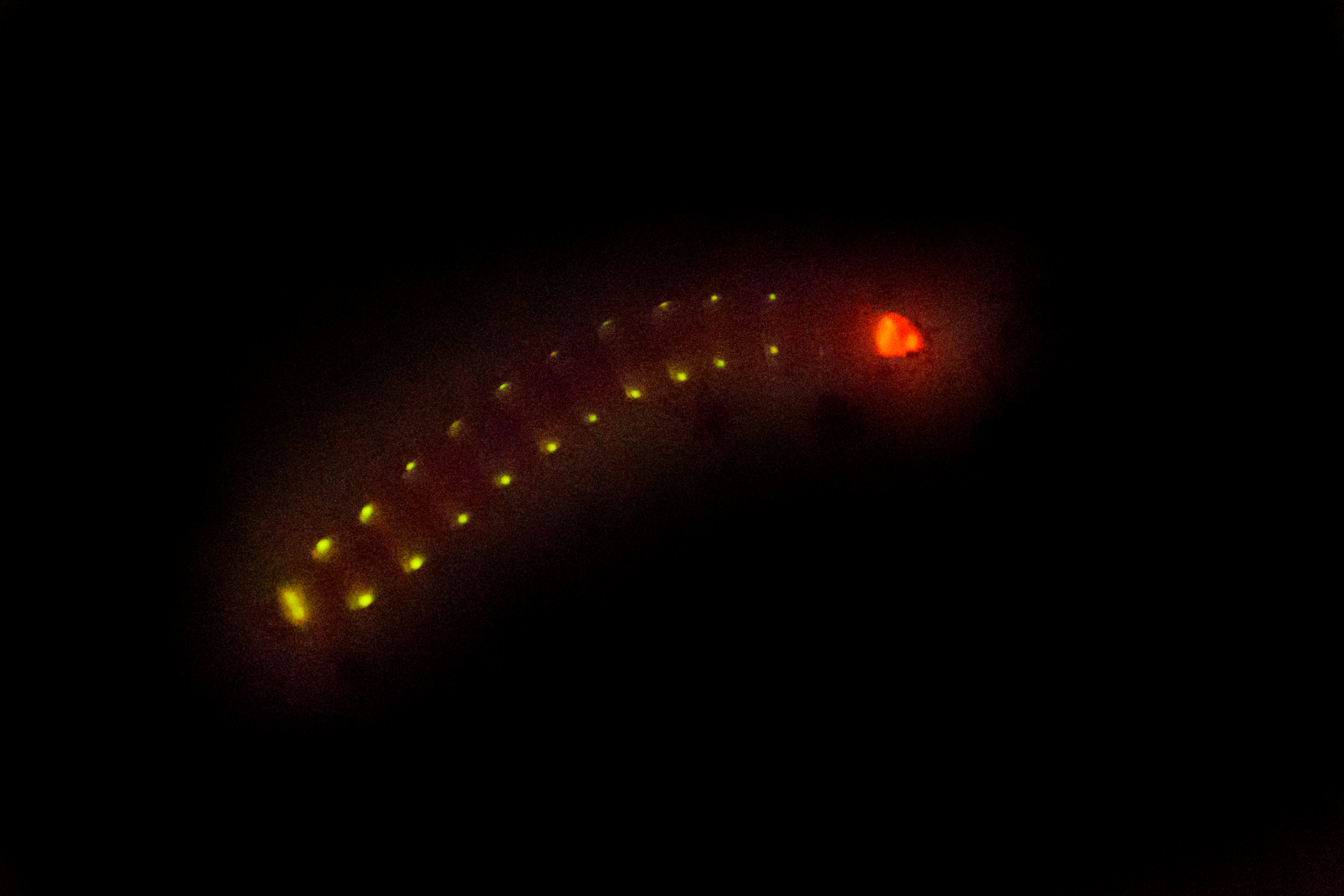

Scientific classification
- Kingdom: Animalia
- Phylum: Arthropoda
- Clade: Pancrustacea
- Class: Insecta
- Order: Coleoptera
- Suborder: Polyphaga
- Infraorder: Elateriformia
- Family: Phengodidae
- Genus: Phrixothrix
- Species: P. hirtus

Binomial name
- Phrixothrix hirtus E. Olivier, 1909

= Phrixothrix hirtus =

Species of beetle

Phrixothrix hirtus is a species of railroad worm found in Brazil. It is the only terrestrial animal capable of naturally producing red bioluminescence. Adults can be found in October and November.

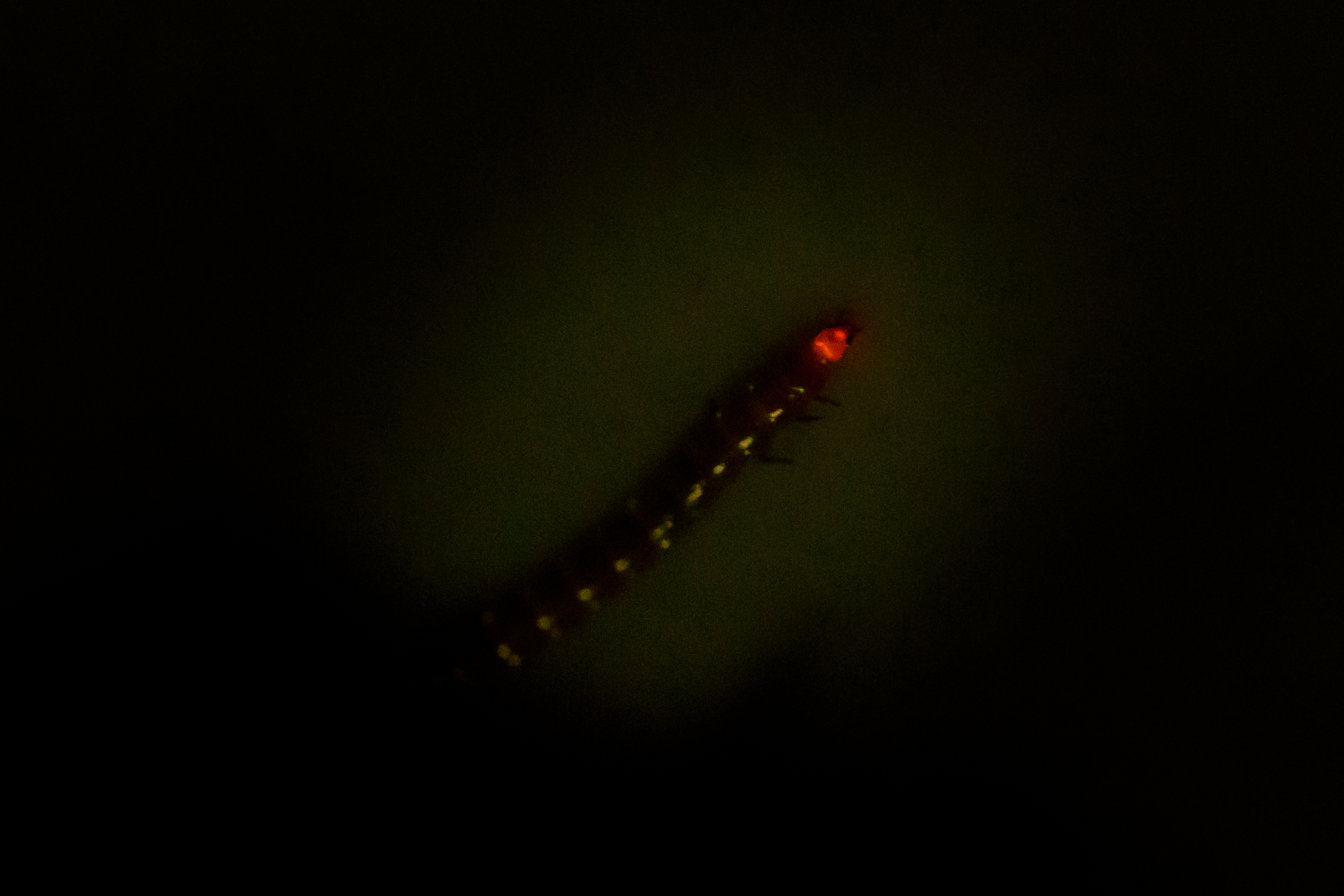
Phrixothrix hirtus in Brazil

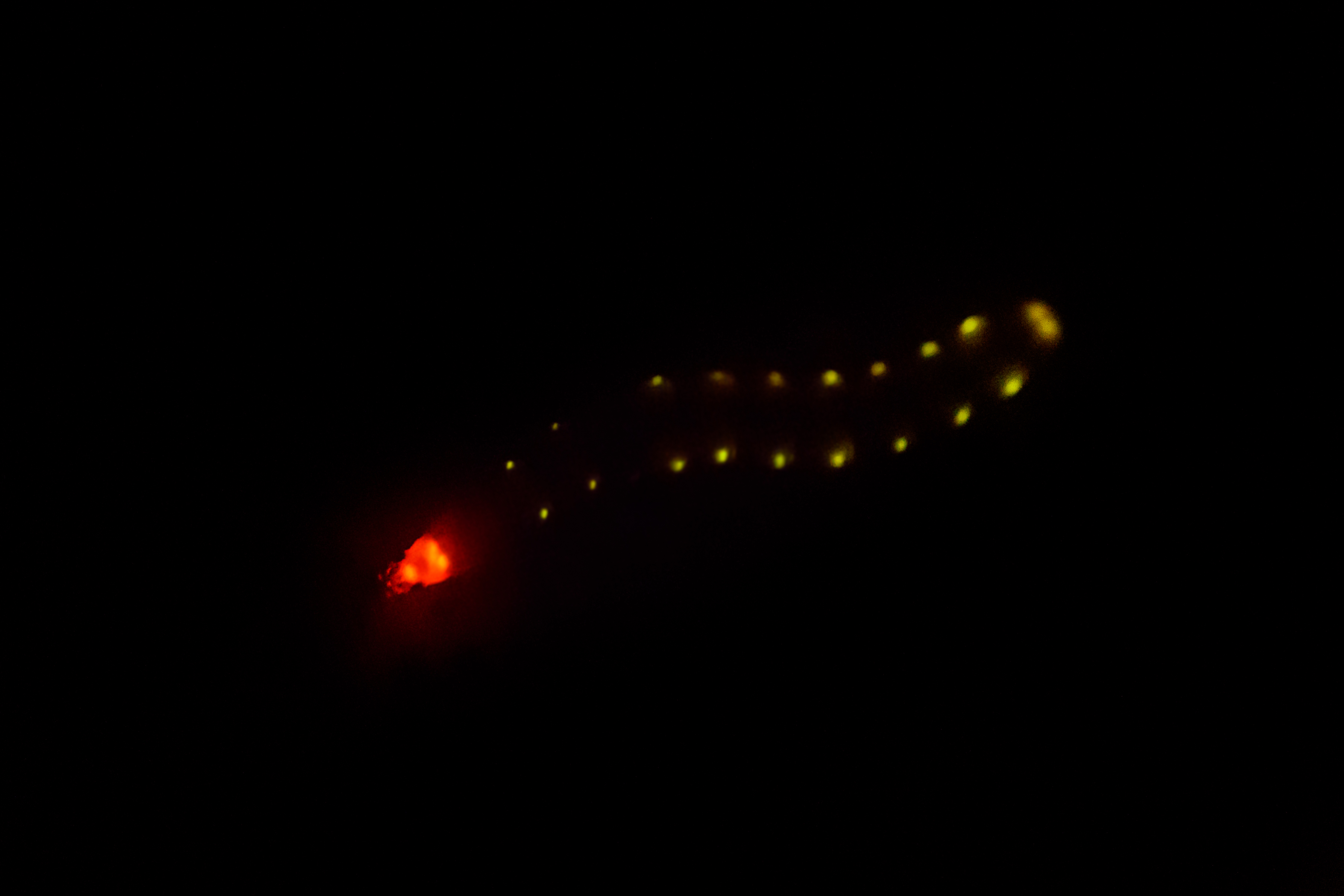
Phrixothrix hirtus in Brazil
