= Phengodes arizonensis =

Scientific classification
- Domain: Eukaryota
- Kingdom: Animalia
- Phylum: Arthropoda
- Class: Insecta
- Order: Coleoptera
- Suborder: Polyphaga
- Infraorder: Elateriformia
- Family: Phengodidae
- Genus: Phengodes
- Species: P. arizonensis

Binomial name
- Phengodes arizonensis Wittmer, 1976

Species of beetle

Phengodes arizonensis is a species of glowworm beetle in the family Phengodidae. It is found in North America.
