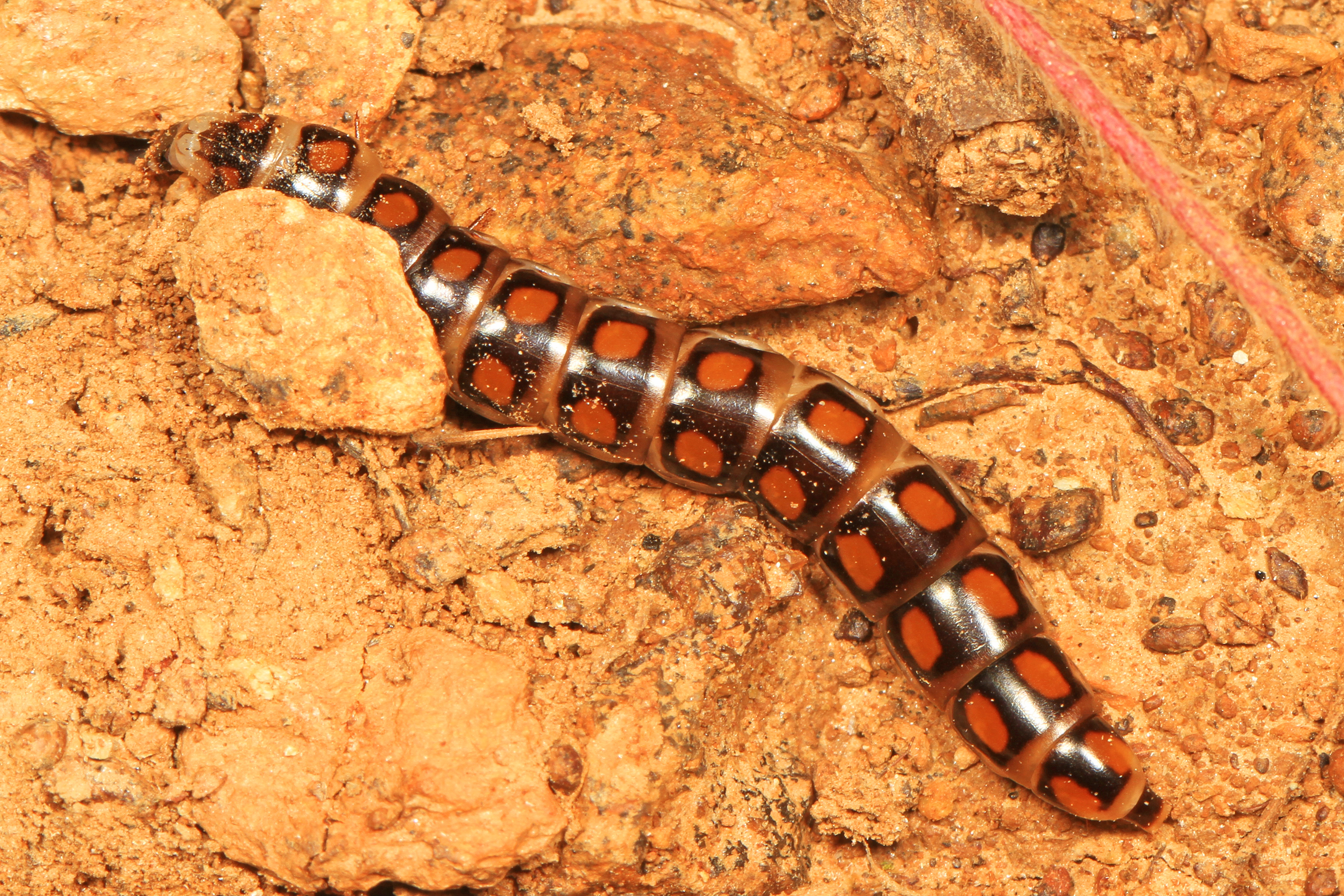

Scientific classification
- Domain: Eukaryota
- Kingdom: Animalia
- Phylum: Arthropoda
- Class: Insecta
- Order: Coleoptera
- Suborder: Polyphaga
- Infraorder: Elateriformia
- Family: Phengodidae
- Genus: Phengodes
- Species: P. nigromaculata

Binomial name
- Phengodes nigromaculata Wittmer, 1976

= Phengodes nigromaculata =

Species of beetle

Phengodes nigromaculata is a species of glowworm beetle in the family Phengodidae. It is found in North America.
