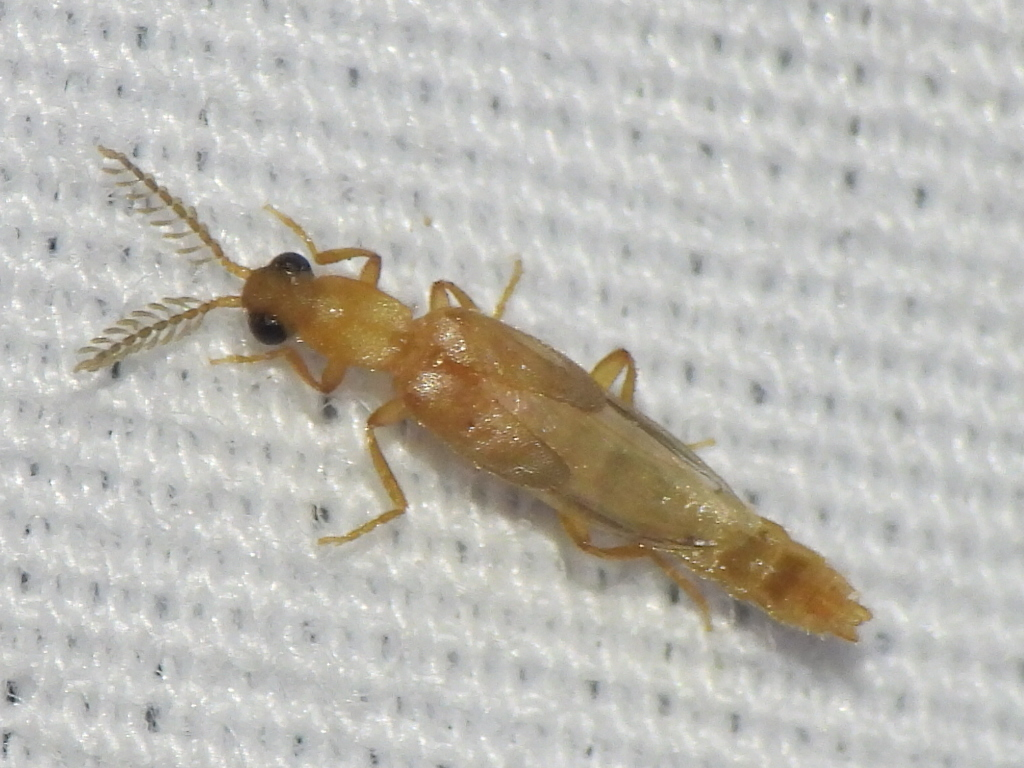

Scientific classification
- Kingdom: Animalia
- Phylum: Arthropoda
- Class: Insecta
- Order: Coleoptera
- Suborder: Polyphaga
- Infraorder: Elateriformia
- Family: Phengodidae
- Genus: Cenophengus
- Species: C. pallidus

Binomial name
- Cenophengus pallidus Schaeffer, 1904

= Cenophengus pallidus =

Species of beetle

Cenophengus pallidus is a species of glowworm beetle in the family Phengodidae. It is found in North America.
