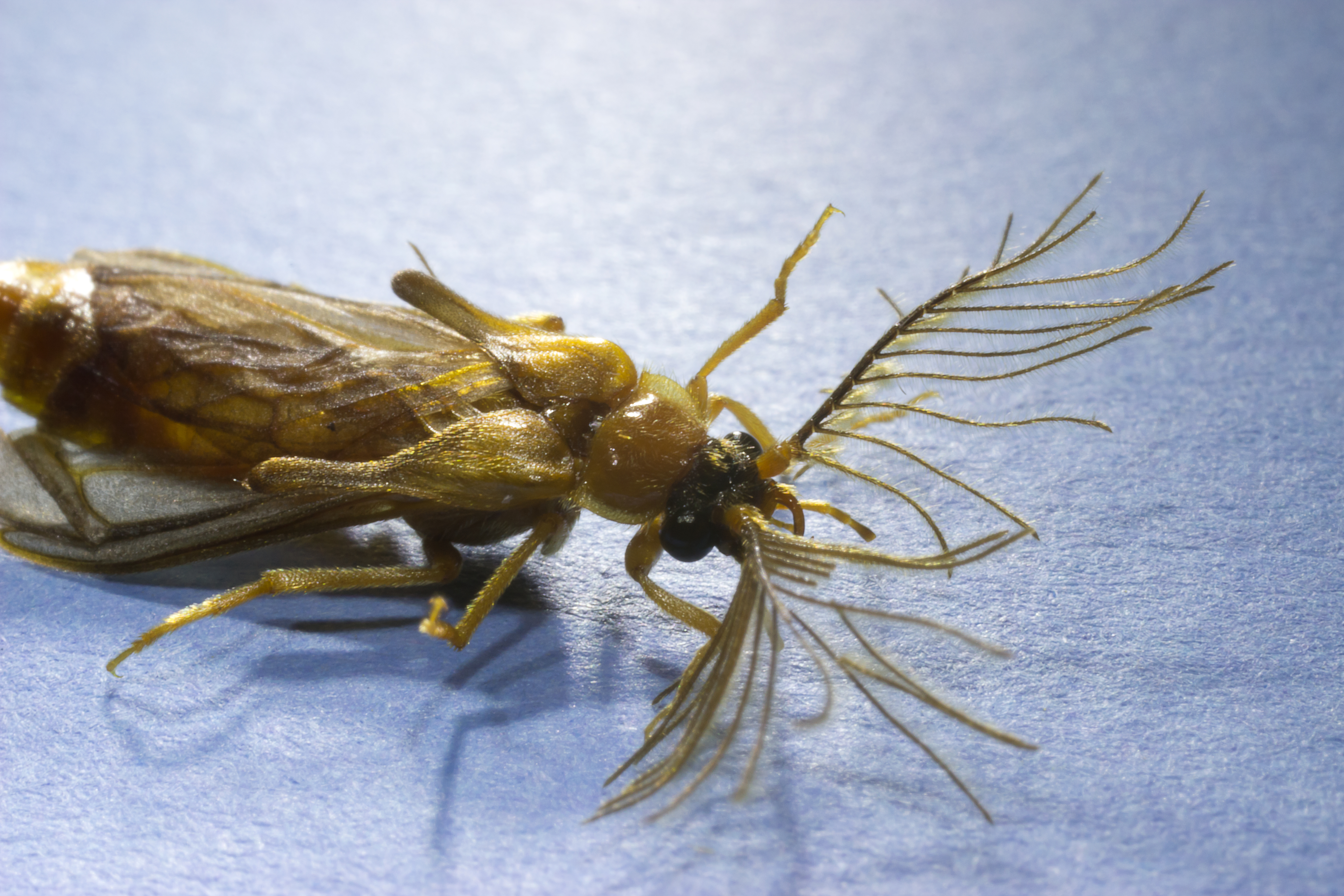

Scientific classification
- Kingdom: Animalia
- Phylum: Arthropoda
- Clade: Pancrustacea
- Class: Insecta
- Order: Coleoptera
- Suborder: Polyphaga
- Infraorder: Elateriformia
- Family: Phengodidae
- Genus: Phengodes
- Species: P. plumosa

Binomial name
- Phengodes plumosa (Olivier, 1790)

Synonyms
- Lampyris plumosa Olivier, 1790

= Phengodes plumosa =

Species of beetle

Phengodes plumosa, known generally as the glow worm or railroad-worm, is a species of glowworm beetle in the family Phengodidae. It is found in North America.
