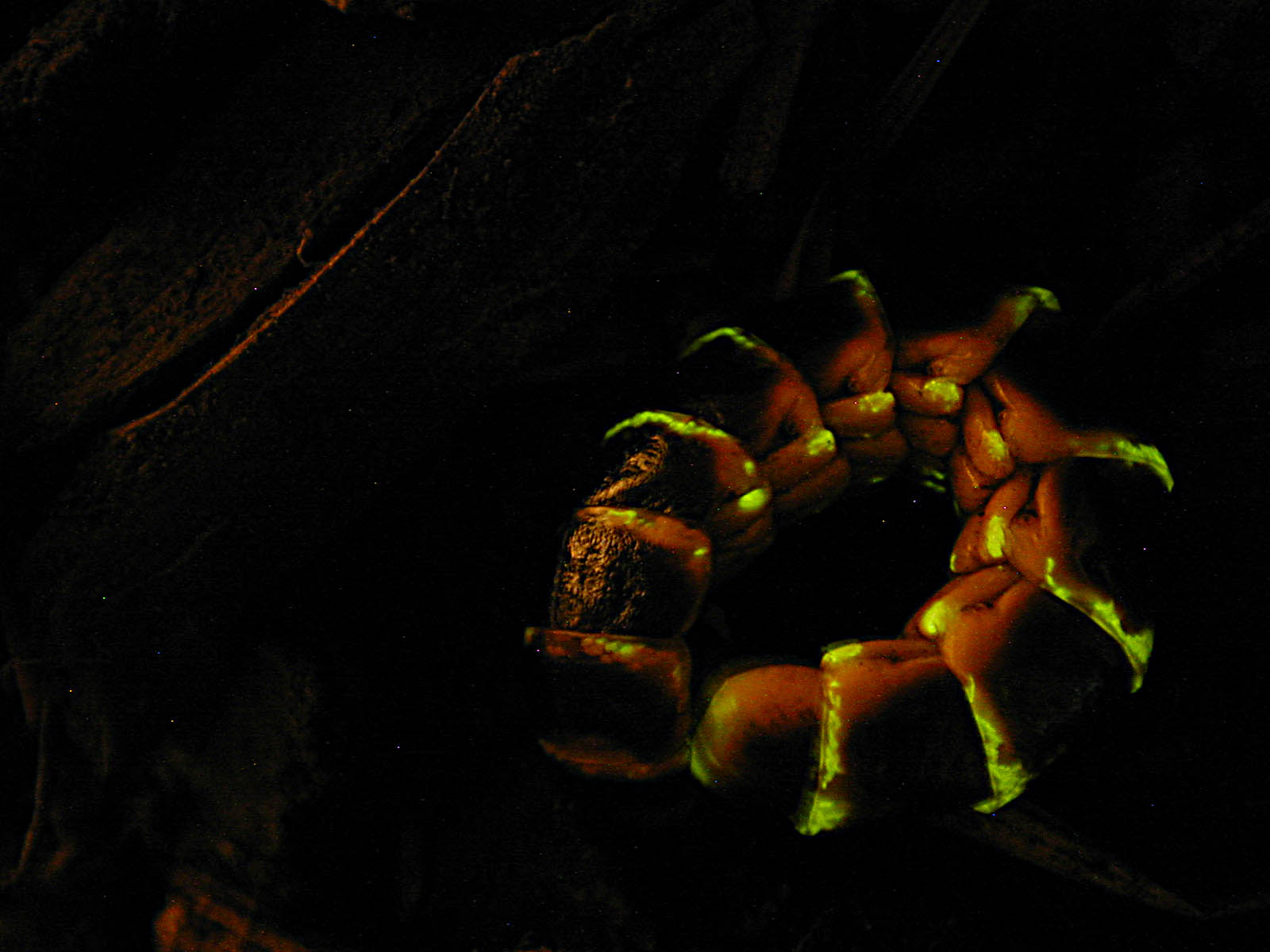

Scientific classification
- Kingdom: Animalia
- Phylum: Arthropoda
- Class: Insecta
- Order: Coleoptera
- Suborder: Polyphaga
- Infraorder: Elateriformia
- Family: Phengodidae
- Genus: Zarhipis
- Species: Z. integripennis

Binomial name
- Zarhipis integripennis (LeConte, 1874)

Synonyms
- Zarhipis alamedae Fall, 1923; Zarhipis amictus Fall, 1923; Zarhipis brevicollis Fall, 1923; Zarhipis piciventris LeConte, 1881; Zarhipis riversi Horn, 1885; Zarhipis ruficollis LeConte, 1881

= Zarhipis integripennis =

Species of beetle

Zarhipis integripennis, the western banded glowworm, is a species of glowworm beetle in the family Phengodidae. It is found in North America.

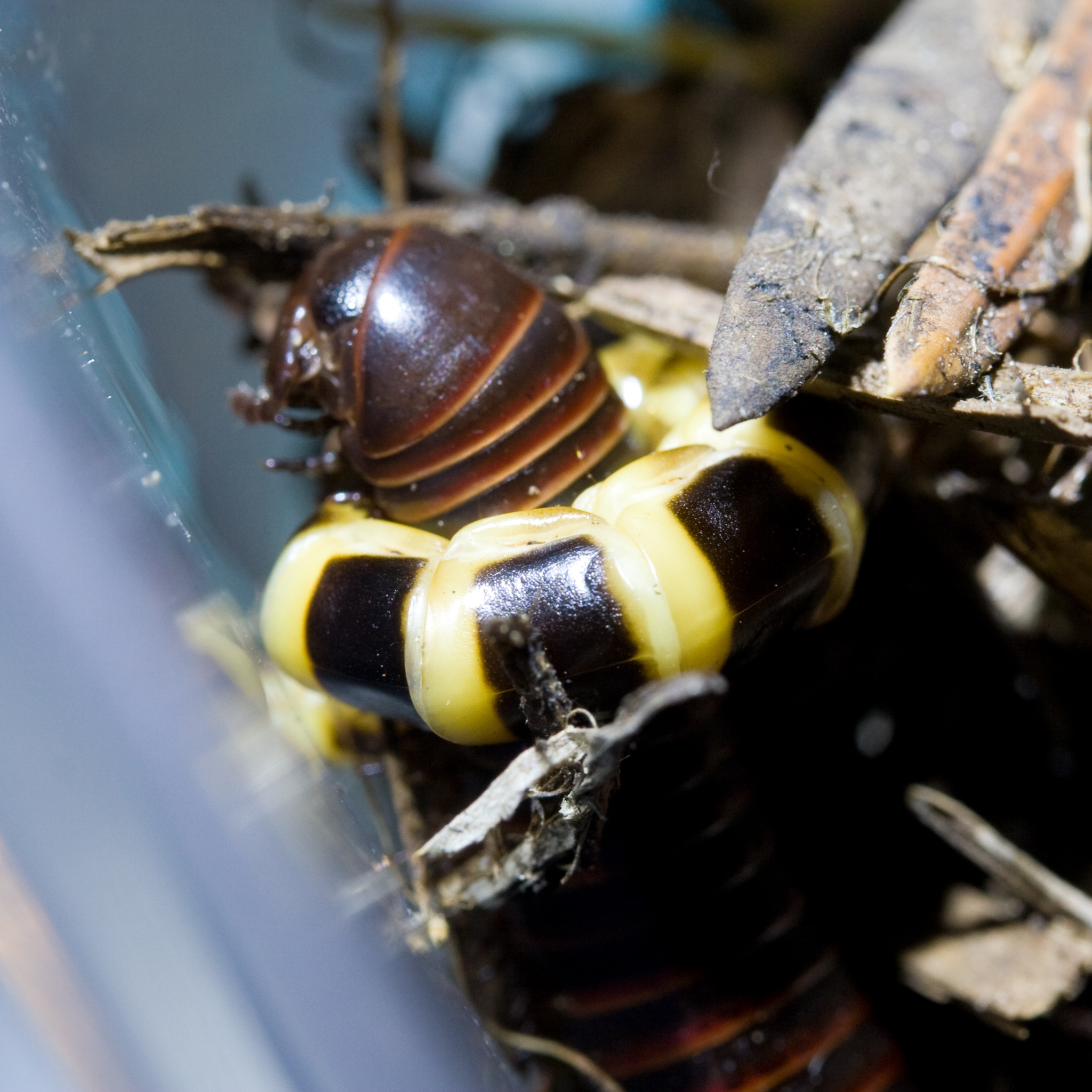
Eating a millipede
