= Paraptorthodius mirabilis =

Scientific classification
- Domain: Eukaryota
- Kingdom: Animalia
- Phylum: Arthropoda
- Class: Insecta
- Order: Coleoptera
- Suborder: Polyphaga
- Infraorder: Elateriformia
- Family: Phengodidae
- Genus: Paraptorthodius
- Species: P. mirabilis

Binomial name
- Paraptorthodius mirabilis Schaeffer, 1904

Species of beetle

Paraptorthodius mirabilis is a species of glowworm beetle in the family Phengodidae. It is found in North America.
