= Phengodes fusciceps =

Scientific classification
- Domain: Eukaryota
- Kingdom: Animalia
- Phylum: Arthropoda
- Class: Insecta
- Order: Coleoptera
- Suborder: Polyphaga
- Infraorder: Elateriformia
- Family: Phengodidae
- Genus: Phengodes
- Species: P. fusciceps

Binomial name
- Phengodes fusciceps LeConte, 1861

Species of beetle

Phengodes fusciceps is a species of glowworm beetle in the family Phengodidae. It is found in North America.

== Subspecies ==
These four subspecies belong to the species Phengodes fusciceps:

- Phengodes fusciceps floridensis Blatchley, 1919
- Phengodes fusciceps fusciceps LeConte, 1861
- Phengodes fusciceps intermedia Wittmer, 1976
- Phengodes fusciceps picicollis Horn, 1891
