= Distremocephalus californicus =

Scientific classification
- Domain: Eukaryota
- Kingdom: Animalia
- Phylum: Arthropoda
- Class: Insecta
- Order: Coleoptera
- Suborder: Polyphaga
- Infraorder: Elateriformia
- Family: Phengodidae
- Genus: Distremocephalus
- Species: D. californicus

Binomial name
- Distremocephalus californicus (Van Dyke, 1918)

Species of beetle

Distremocephalus californicus is a species of glowworm beetle in the family Phengodidae. It is found in Central America and North America.
