= Distremocephalus texanus =

Scientific classification
- Kingdom: Animalia
- Phylum: Arthropoda
- Class: Insecta
- Order: Coleoptera
- Suborder: Polyphaga
- Infraorder: Elateriformia
- Family: Phengodidae
- Genus: Distremocephalus
- Species: D. texanus

Binomial name
- Distremocephalus texanus (LeConte, 1874)

Species of beetle

Distremocephalus texanus, the little Texas glowworm, is a species of glowworm beetle in the family Phengodidae. It is found in Central America and North America.
