= Phengodinae =

Scientific classification
- Kingdom: Animalia
- Phylum: Arthropoda
- Class: Insecta
- Order: Coleoptera
- Suborder: Polyphaga
- Infraorder: Elateriformia
- Family: Phengodidae
- Subfamily: Phengodinae; LeConte, 1861

Genera
- Several, see text

Subfamily of beetles

The Phengodinae are a subfamily of phengodid beetles (Phengodidae). It contains mostly North American species.

== Genera ==
- Microphengodes Wittmer, 1976, 2 spp.
- Phengodes Illiger, 1807
  - subgenus Phengodella Wittmer, 1975, 20 spp.
  - subgenus Phengodes Illiger, 1807, 10 spp.
- Pseudophengodes Pic, 1930, 26 spp.
- Zarhipis LeConte, 1881, 3 spp.
