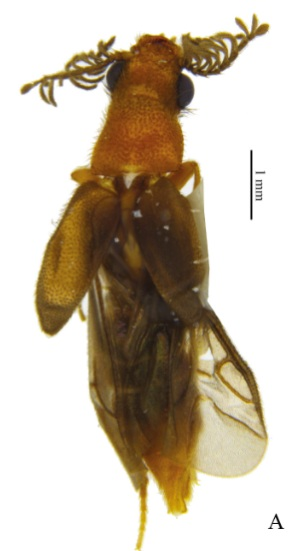

Scientific classification
- Kingdom: Animalia
- Phylum: Arthropoda
- Class: Insecta
- Order: Coleoptera
- Suborder: Polyphaga
- Infraorder: Elateriformia
- Family: Phengodidae
- Genus: Iviephengus
- Species: I. ferreirai

Binomial name
- Iviephengus ferreirai Roza, 2023

Synonyms
- Hoplideres rugicollis Waterhouse, 1878

= Iviephengus =

Genus of beetles

Iviephengus is a genus of glowworm beetles in the family Phengodidae. Iviephengus ferreirai is the only species of the genus. It is found in the Peruvian Amazon.

== Description ==
Adults reach a length of about 3.3–3.8 mm and have a yellowish brown body, with the meso- and metanotum, anterior half of the metasternum and abdominal tergites and ventrites dark brown (with the exception of the last two).

== Etymology ==
This species is named in honour of Vinicius S. Ferreira, a good friend of the author and a fellow Coleoptera researcher.
