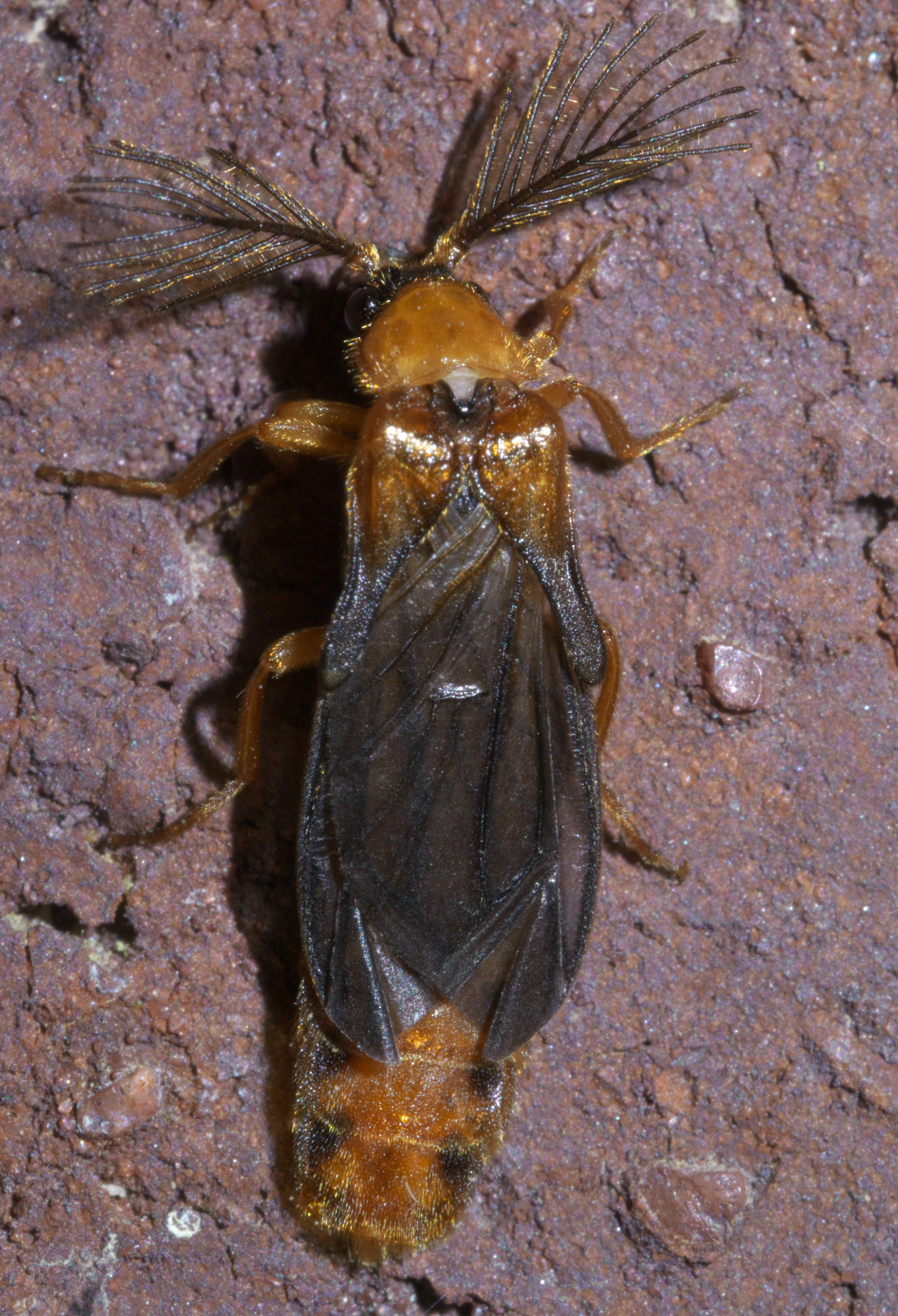

Scientific classification
- Domain: Eukaryota
- Kingdom: Animalia
- Phylum: Arthropoda
- Class: Insecta
- Order: Coleoptera
- Suborder: Polyphaga
- Infraorder: Elateriformia
- Family: Phengodidae
- Subfamily: Phengodinae
- Tribe: Phengodini
- Genus: Phengodes; Illiger, 1807

= Phengodes =

Genus of beetles

Phengodes is a genus of glowworms in the beetle family Phengodidae. There are more than 30 described species in Phengodes.

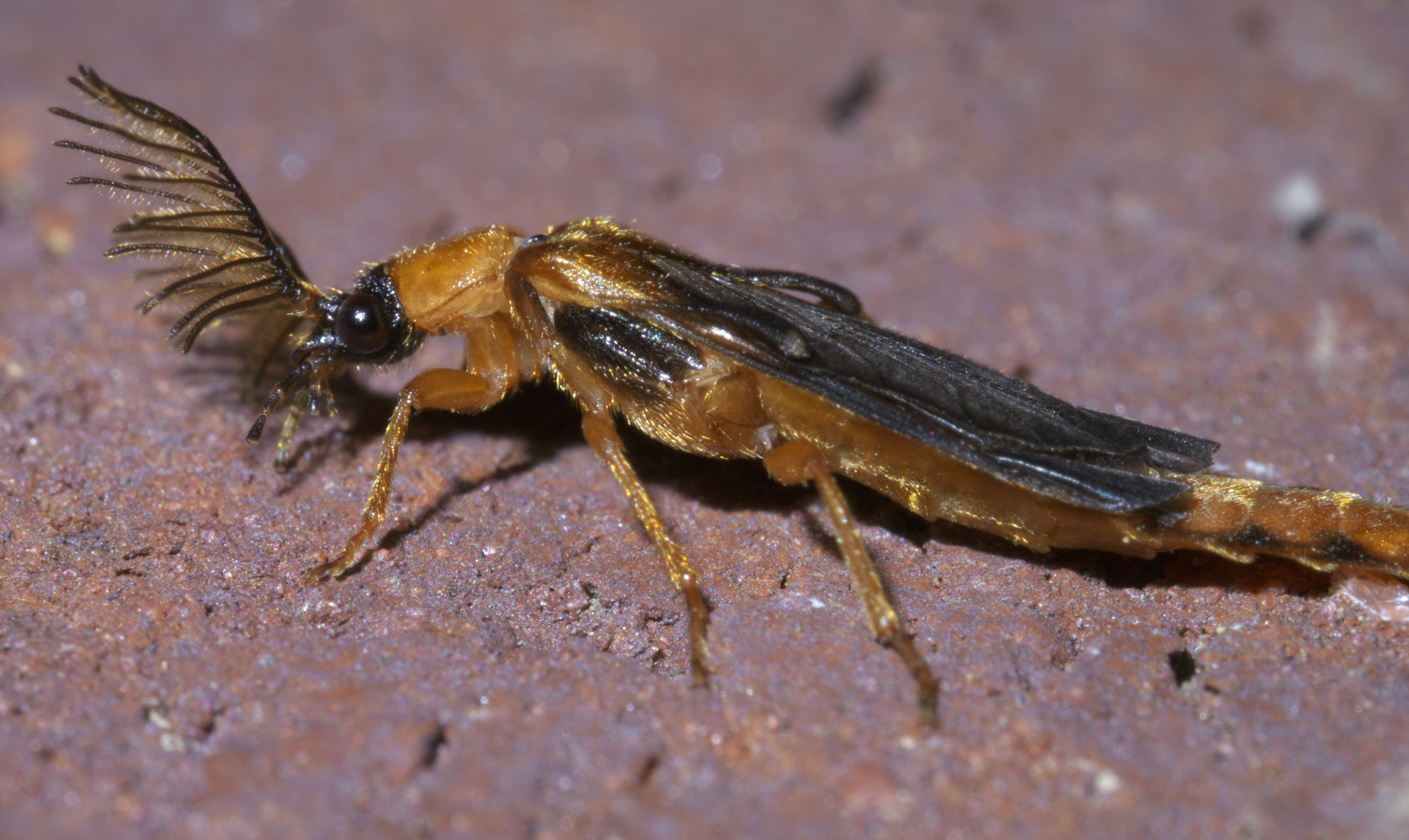
Glowworms, Phengodes

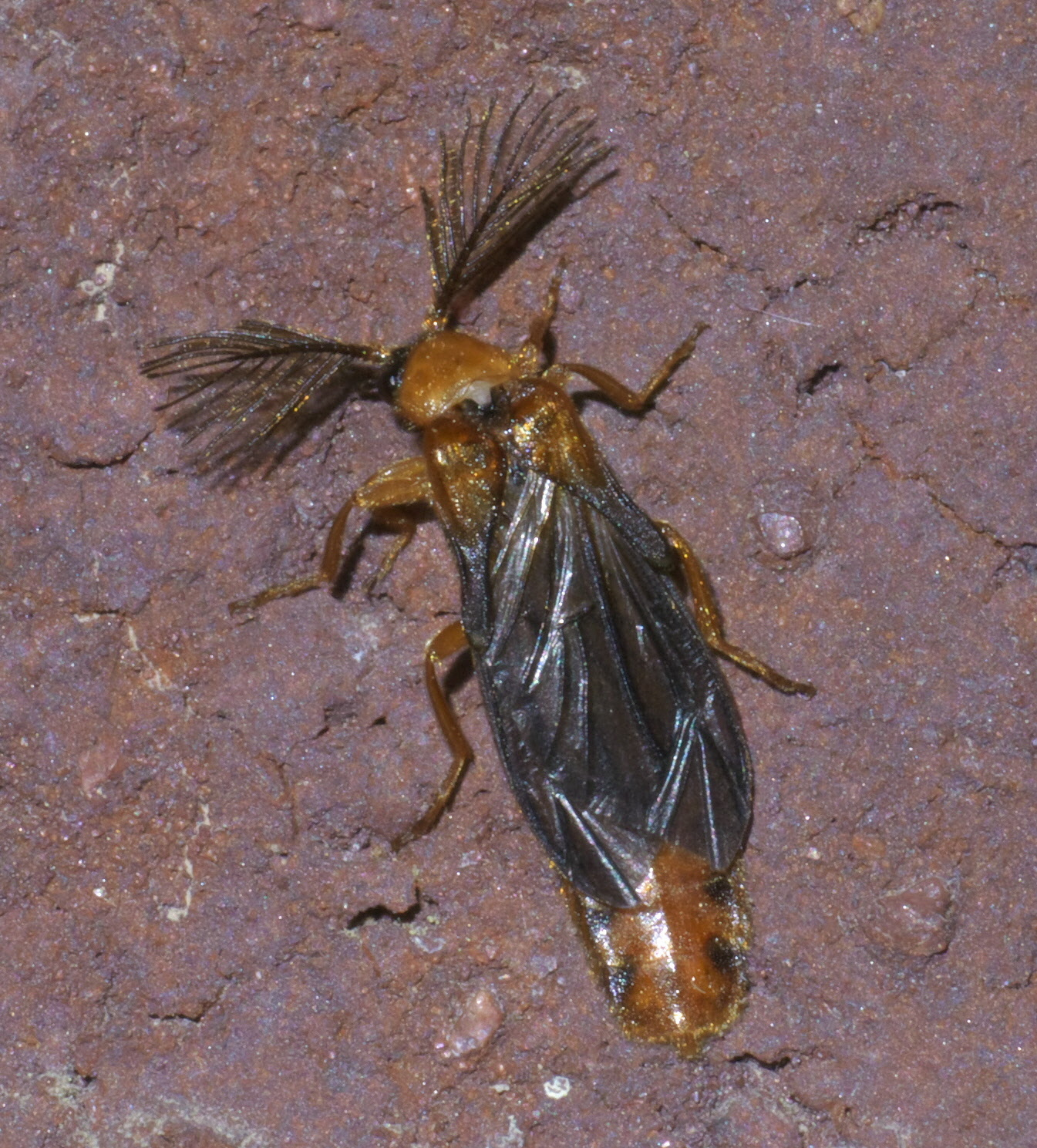
Glowworms, Phengodes

== Species ==
- Phengodes arizonensis Wittmer, 1976
- Phengodes atezcana Zaragoza, 1980
- Phengodes bella Barber, 1913
- Phengodes bimaculata Gorham, 1881
- Phengodes bipennifera Gorham, 1881
- Phengodes bolivari Zaragoza-Caballero, 1981
- Phengodes brailovskyi Zaragoza & Wittmer, 1986
- Phengodes chamelensis Zaragoza, 2004
- Phengodes championi Pic, 1927
- Phengodes ecuadoriana Wittmer, 1988
- Phengodes fenestrata Wittmer, 1976
- Phengodes frontalis LeConte, 1881
- Phengodes fusciceps LeConte, 1861
- Phengodes inflata Wittmer, 1976
- Phengodes insignis Bourgeois, 1888
- Phengodes insulcata Pic, 1925
- Phengodes laticollis LeConte, 1881
- Phengodes leonilae Zaragoza & Wittmer, 1986
- Phengodes mexicana Wittmer, 1976
- Phengodes minor Gorham, 1881
- Phengodes nigricornis Gorham, 1881
- Phengodes nigromaculata Wittmer, 1976
- Phengodes osculati (Spinola, 1854)
- Phengodes plumosa (Olivier, 1790) (glow worm)
- Phengodes succinacia Zaragoza, 2004
- Phengodes tuxtlaensis Zaragoza, 1989
- Phengodes varicolor Zaragoza & Wittmer, 1986
- Phengodes variicornis Zaragoza & Wittmer, 1986
- Phengodes vazquezae Zaragoza, 1979
- Phengodes venezolana Wittmer, 1988
