= Cydistinae =

Scientific classification
- Kingdom: Animalia
- Phylum: Arthropoda
- Clade: Pancrustacea
- Class: Insecta
- Order: Coleoptera
- Suborder: Polyphaga
- Infraorder: Elateriformia
- Superfamily: Elateroidea
- Family: Phengodidae
- Subfamily: Cydistinae; Paulus, 1972

Genera
- Cydistus 6 spp. Microcydistus 1 sp.

Subfamily of beetles

The Cydistinae are a subfamily of phengodid beetles (Phengodidae) commonly known as glowworms. It contains the genera Cydistus and Microcydistus. The Cydistinae were until recently, incertae sedis due to their strange morphological characteristics, however molecular phylogenetics have shown them to be members of the Phengodidae. Unlike other Phengogidae, which are found exclusively in the Americas, Cydistinae are found in western Asia, including Southern and eastern Turkey, Jordan, Israel, Iraq, Iran, and possibly Syria.

The biology of Cydistinae larva and adult females are not known, as only adult males have been described thus far. But, given that all the known larvae and neotenic larva-like females of the closely related Rhagophthalmidae and Phengodidae are bioluminescent, live in leaf litter and soil, and feed on millipedes, the larva and females of the Cydistinae likely possess similar characteristics.

The Cydistinae represent the earliest diverging lineage of the Phengodidae yet known, and are also sister to the Rhagophthalmidae.
