= Paraptorthodius =

Scientific classification
- Domain: Eukaryota
- Kingdom: Animalia
- Phylum: Arthropoda
- Class: Insecta
- Order: Coleoptera
- Suborder: Polyphaga
- Infraorder: Elateriformia
- Family: Phengodidae
- Tribe: Mastinocerini
- Genus: Paraptorthodius; Schaeffer, 1904

Genus of beetles

Paraptorthodius is a genus of glowworm beetles in the family Phengodidae. There are at least three described species in Paraptorthodius.

== Species ==
These three species belong to the genus Paraptorthodius:

- Paraptorthodius mirabilis Schaeffer, 1904
- Paraptorthodius queretaroensis Zaragoza, 1999
- Paraptorthodius schaefferi Zaragoza, 1989
