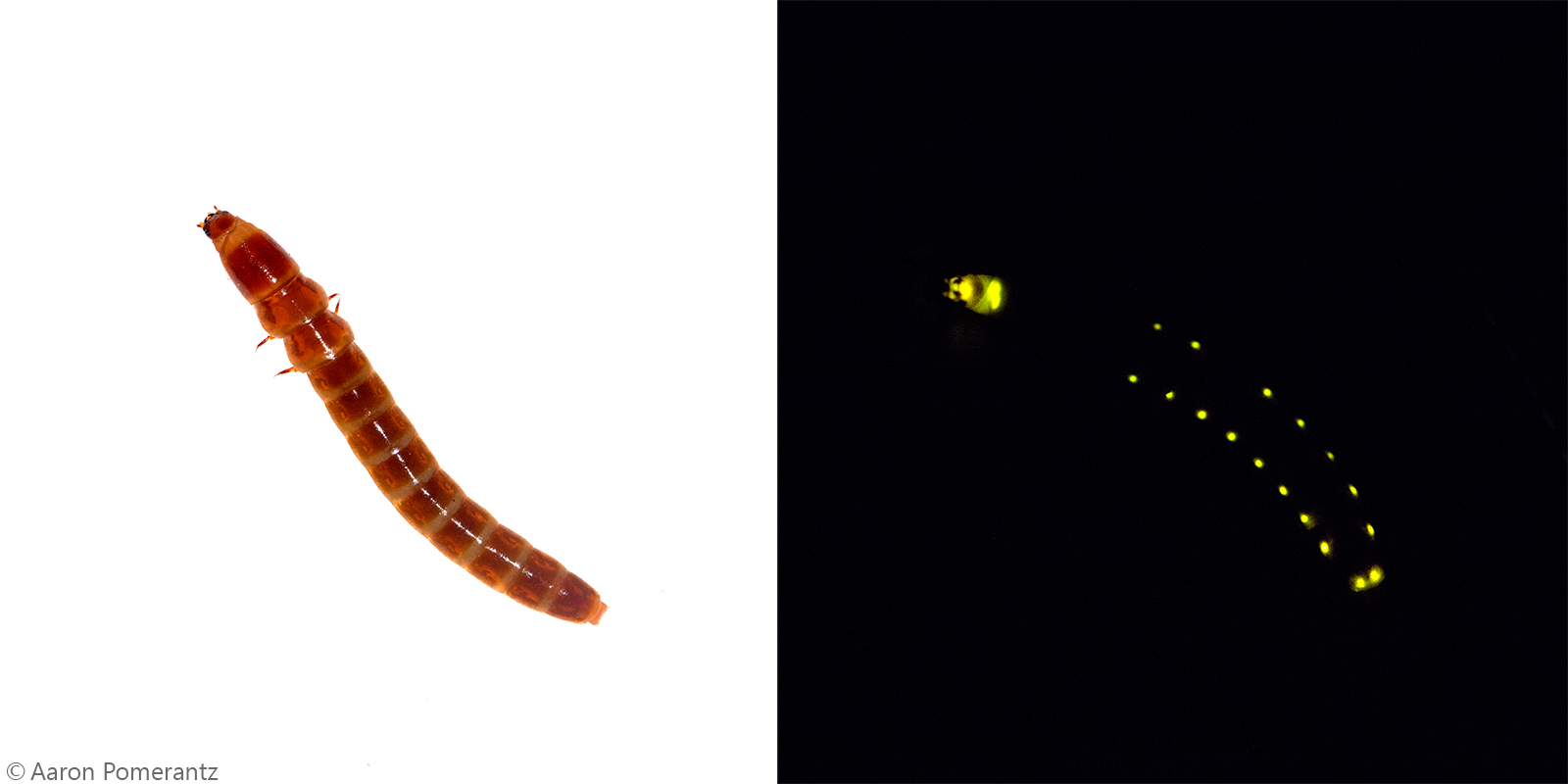

Scientific classification
- Kingdom: Animalia
- Phylum: Arthropoda
- Clade: Pancrustacea
- Class: Insecta
- Order: Coleoptera
- Suborder: Polyphaga
- Infraorder: Elateriformia
- Family: Phengodidae
- Genus: Phrixothrix; E.Olivier, 1909

Species
- Phrixothrix hirtus

= Railroad worm =

Genus of beetles

A railroad worm is a larva or larviform female adult of a beetle of the genus Phrixothrix in the family Phengodidae, characterized by the possession of two different colors of bioluminescence. It has the appearance of a caterpillar. The eleven pairs of luminescent organs on their second thoracic segment through their ninth abdominal segment can glow yellowish-green, while the pair on their head can glow red; this is due to different luciferases in their bodies, as the reaction substrate, called luciferin, is the same.

The "railroad worm" name arises because these glowing spots along the body resemble the windows of train cars internally illuminated in the night. The light emissions are believed to be a warning signal to nocturnal predators of their unpalatability or a defense function as they can suddenly be turned on, spooking predators with a sudden flash. When handled, the larva may eject a possibly distasteful and corrosive reddish liquid.

Their light organs, called lanterns, can produce colors ranging from green and yellow to red and orange, depending on the species. This color variation comes from differences in luciferase enzymes that fuel their chemical light reactions. Research has shown that Mastinocerini (the tribe that includes the genus) species evolved distinct luciferases that create these multiple light colors, giving insight into how bioluminescence diversified within the group.

The term "railroad worm" is also sometimes applied to the apple maggot.
