= Distremocephalus =

Scientific classification
- Domain: Eukaryota
- Kingdom: Animalia
- Phylum: Arthropoda
- Class: Insecta
- Order: Coleoptera
- Suborder: Polyphaga
- Infraorder: Elateriformia
- Family: Phengodidae
- Tribe: Mastinocerini
- Genus: Distremocephalus; Wittmer, 1976

Genus of beetles

Distremocephalus is a genus of glowworm beetles in the family Phengodidae. There are about 11 described species in Distremocephalus.

== Species ==
- Distremocephalus barrerai Zaragoza, 1986
- Distremocephalus beutelspacheri Zaragoza, 1986
- Distremocephalus buenoi Zaragoza, 1986
- Distremocephalus californicus (Van Dyke, 1918)
- Distremocephalus chiapensis Zaragoza, 1986
- Distremocephalus leonilae Zaragoza, 1986
- Distremocephalus mexicanus (Wittmer, 1963)
- Distremocephalus opaculus (Horn, 1895)
- Distremocephalus rufocaudatus Zaragoza, 1986
- Distremocephalus texanus (LeConte, 1874) (little Texas glowworm)
- Distremocephalus wittmeri Zaragoza, 1986
