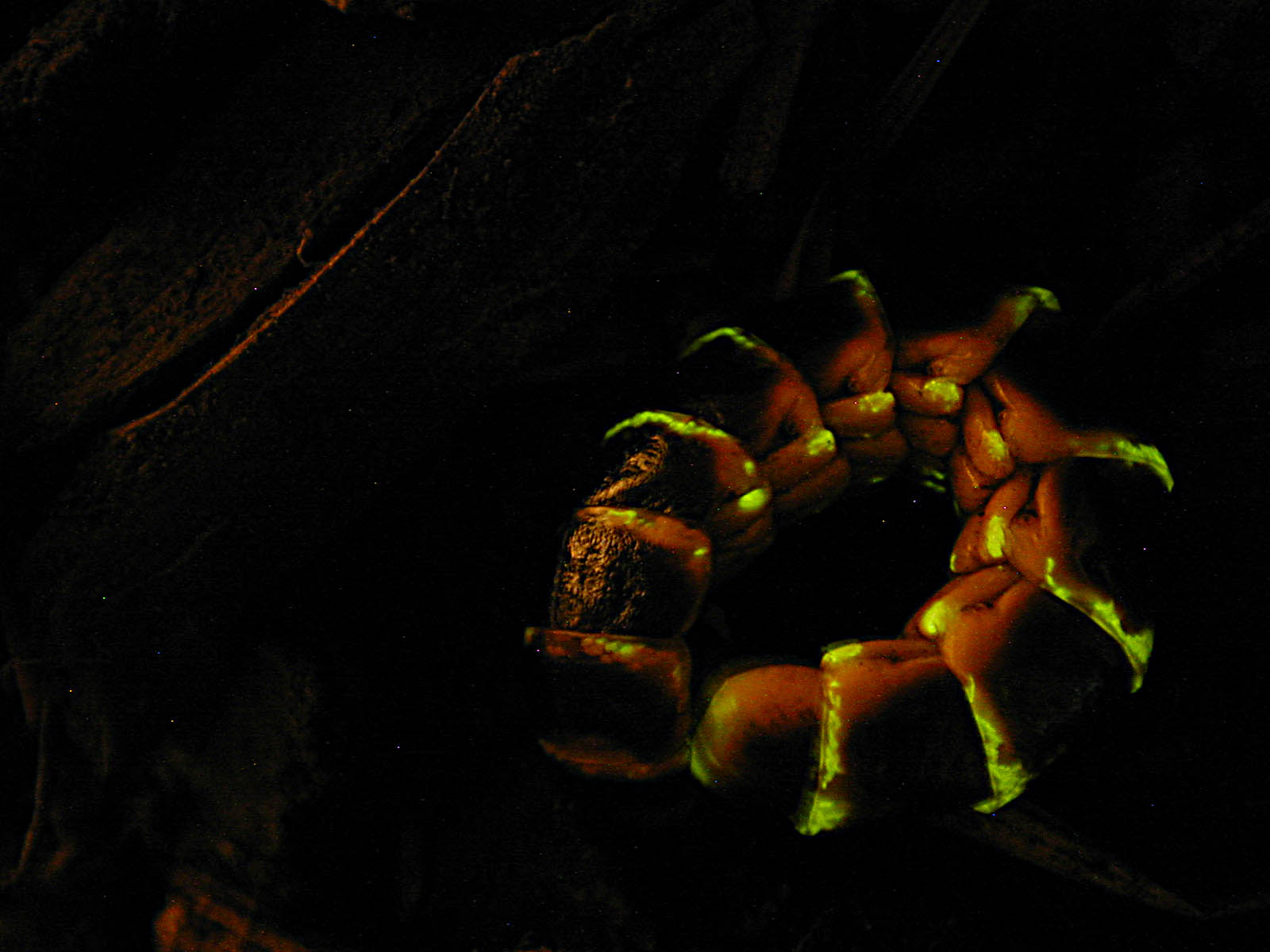
- Zarhipis integripennis

Scientific classification
- Kingdom: Animalia
- Phylum: Arthropoda
- Class: Insecta
- Order: Coleoptera
- Suborder: Polyphaga
- Infraorder: Elateriformia
- Family: Phengodidae
- Tribe: Phengodini
- Genus: Zarhipis; LeConte, 1881

= Zarhipis =

Genus of beetles

Zarhipis is a genus of glowworm beetles in the family Phengodidae. There are three recognized species in Zarhipis, all restricted to the western regions of North America.

== Species ==
These three species belong to the genus Zarhipis:

- Zarhipis integripennis (LeConte, 1874)^{i c g b} (western banded glowworm)
- Zarhipis tiemanni Linsdale, 1964^{i c g}
- Zarhipis truncaticeps Fall, 1923^{i c g}

Data sources: i = ITIS, c = Catalogue of Life, g = GBIF, b = Bugguide.net
