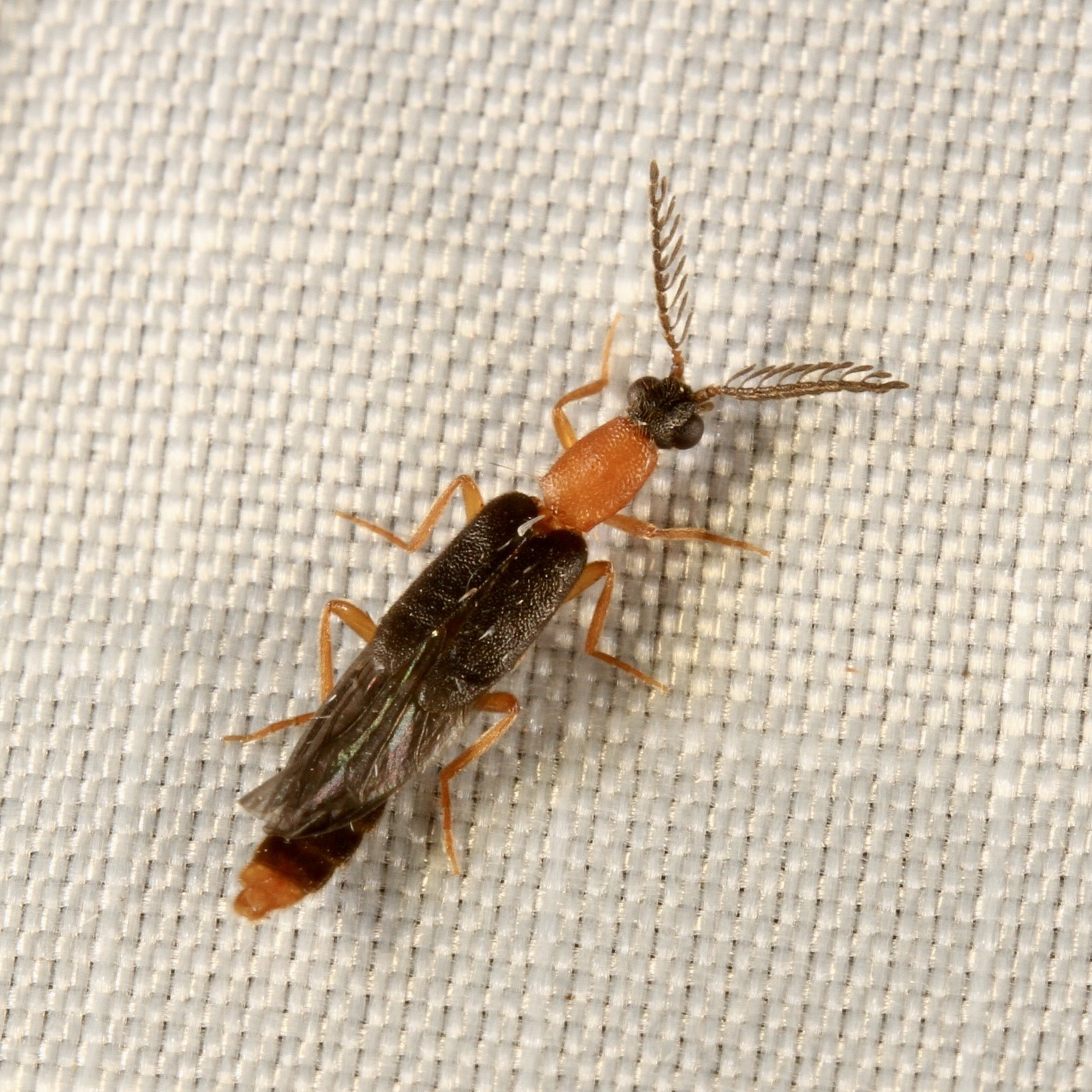
- Cenophengus longicollis

Scientific classification
- Kingdom: Animalia
- Phylum: Arthropoda
- Class: Insecta
- Order: Coleoptera
- Suborder: Polyphaga
- Infraorder: Elateriformia
- Family: Phengodidae
- Tribe: Mastinocerini
- Genus: Cenophengus; LeConte, 1881

Type species
- Cenophengus debilis LeConte, 1881

= Cenophengus =

Genus of beetles

Cenophengus is a genus of glowworm beetles in the family Phengodidae. There are at least 30 described species in Cenophengus.

== Species ==
- Cenophengus baios Zaragoza-Caballero, 2003
- Cenophengus brunneus Wittmer, 1976
- Cenophengus ciceroi Wittmer, 1981
- Cenophengus cuicatlaensis Zaragoza-Caballero, 2008
- Cenophengus debilis LeConte, 1881
- Cenophengus gardunoi Vega-Badillo, Morrone & Zaragoza-Caballero, 2021
- Cenophengus gorhami Zaragoza-Callero, 1986
- Cenophengus hnogamui Vega-Badillo, Zaragoza-Caballero & Ríos-Ibarra, 2021
- Cenophengus howdeni Zaragoza-Caballero, 1986
- Cenophengus huatulcoensis Zaragoza-Caballero, 2008
- Cenophengus kikapu Vega-Badillo, Zaragoza-Caballero & Ríos-Ibarra, 2021
- Cenophengus longicollis Wittmer, 1976
- Cenophengus magnus Zaragoza-Caballero, 1988
- Cenophengus major Wittmer, 1976
- Cenophengus marmoratus Wittmer, 1976
- Cenophengus mboi Vega-Badillo, Zaragoza-Caballero & Ríos-Ibarra, 2021
- Cenophengus mumui Vega-Badillo, Zaragoza-Caballero & Ríos-Ibarra, 2021
- Cenophengus munizi Zaragoza-Caballero, 2008
- Cenophengus niger Wittmer, 1986
- Cenophengus pallidus Schaeffer, 1904
- Cenophengus pedregalensis Zaragoza-Caballero, 1975
- Cenophengus punctatissimus Wittmer, 1976
- Cenophengus saasil Vega-Badillo, Morrone & Zaragoza-Caballero, 2021
- Cenophengus sonoraensis Zaragoza-Caballero, 2008
- Cenophengus tsiik Vega-Badillo, Morrone & Zaragoza-Caballero, 2021
- Cenophengus tupae Vega-Badillo, Zaragoza-Caballero & Ríos-Ibarra, 2021
- Cenophengus villae Zaragoza-Caballero, 1984
- Cenophengus wittmeri Zaragoza-Caballero, 1984
- Cenophengus xiinbali Vega-Badillo, Zaragoza-Caballero & Ríos-Ibarra, 2021
- Cenophengus zuritai Vega-Badillo, Morrone & Zaragoza-Caballero, 2021
