= Ernest Olivier =

French botanist and entomologist (1844–1914)

Joseph Ernest Olivier (January 6, 1844 – January 26, 1914) was a French entomologist and botanist, known as a specialist in fireflies (Lampyridae). As of 1888, he was founder and editor of the journal Revue scientifique du Bourbonnais et du centre de la France. He was also involved in politics, serving as town councillor and later mayor of Chemilly, Allier, and was founder of the Gazette de l'Allier newspaper. He was a member of the Entomological Society of France and the Entomological Society of London. He was the grandson of entomologist Guillaume-Antoine Olivier. His botanical works include Flore populaire de l'Allier.

In his last years of life, Olivier was a member of the Friends of the Natural History Museum Paris, founded in 1907.

In 1922, thus eight years after Olivier's death, the editorial board of the journal Revue scientifique du Bourbonnais founded the "Bourbonnais Scientific Society for the Study and Protection of Nature" (Société scientifique du Bourbonnais pour l'étude et la protection de la nature). Both the Journal and the Society still exist in the present day.

The standard author abbreviation E.Olivier is used to indicate this person as the author when citing a botanical name.
