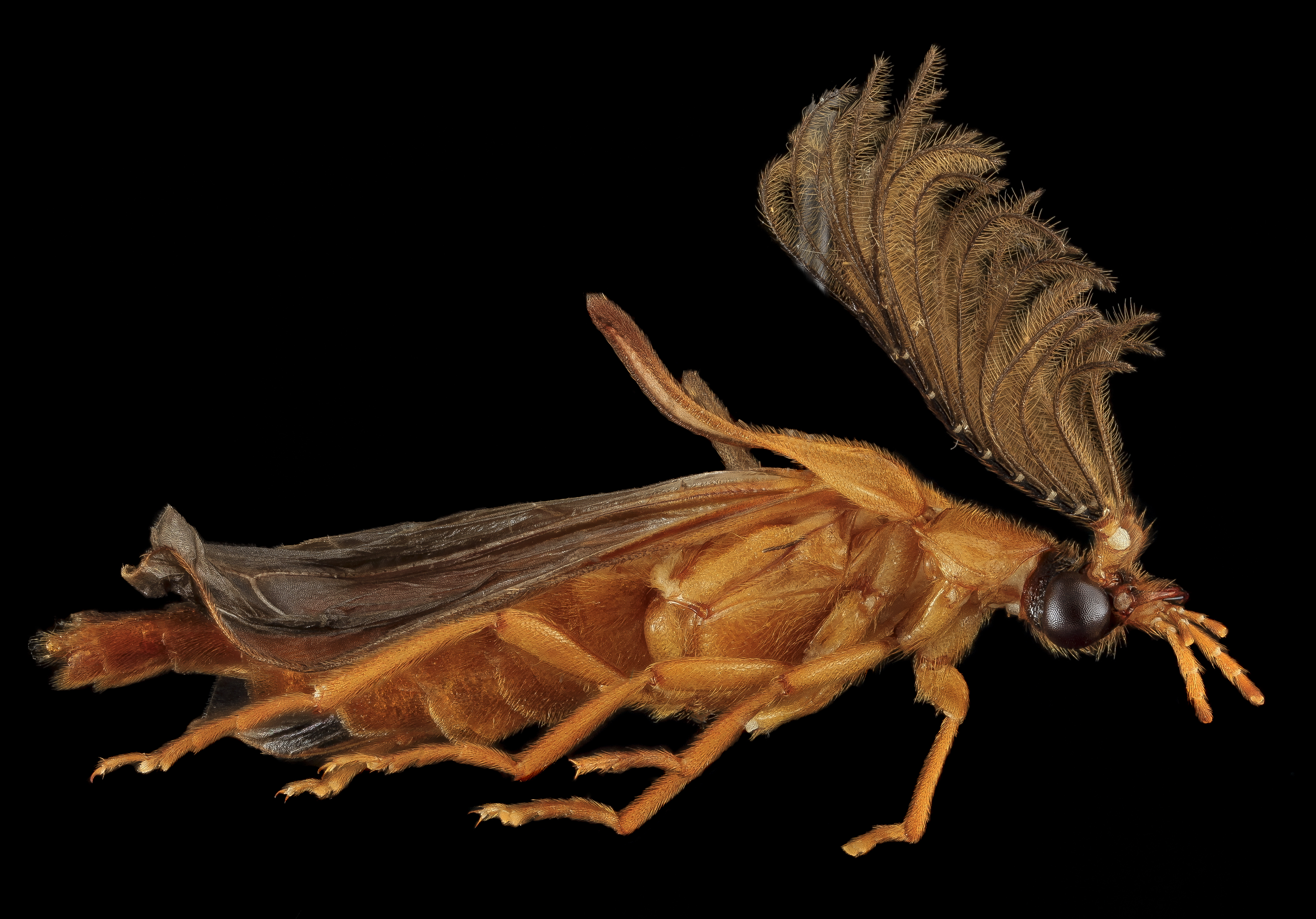
- A male Phengodes

Scientific classification
- Kingdom: Animalia
- Phylum: Arthropoda
- Clade: Pancrustacea
- Class: Insecta
- Order: Coleoptera
- Suborder: Polyphaga
- Infraorder: Elateriformia
- Superfamily: Elateroidea
- Family: Phengodidae; LeConte, 1861

Subfamilies
- Cydistinae Paulus, 1972 Mastinocerinae LeConte, 1881 Phengodinae LeConte, 1861

= Phengodidae =

Family of beetles

The beetle family Phengodidae is known also as glowworm beetles, whose larvae are known as glowworms. The females and larvae have bioluminescent organs. They occur throughout the New World from extreme southern Canada to Chile, numbering over 250 species in total. The recently recognized members of the Phengodidae, the Cydistinae, are found in Western Asia. The family Rhagophthalmidae, an Old World group, used to be included in the Phengodidae.

Larval and larviform female glowworms are predators, feeding on millipedes and other arthropods occurring in soil and litter. The winged males, which are often attracted to lights at night, are short-lived and probably do not feed. Females are much larger than the males and are completely larviform. Males may be luminescent, but females and larvae have a series of luminescent organs on trunk segments which emit yellow or green light, and sometimes an additional head organ which emits red light, as in railroad worms.

This family is distinct from the fireflies (family Lampyridae), which may also be called "glow-worms" in their larval stage. Some early studies suggested that Phengodidae might possibly include (or be sister taxon to) the long-lipped beetles, which were formerly treated as a family Telegeusidae, but these are now treated as a subfamily within the family Omethidae.

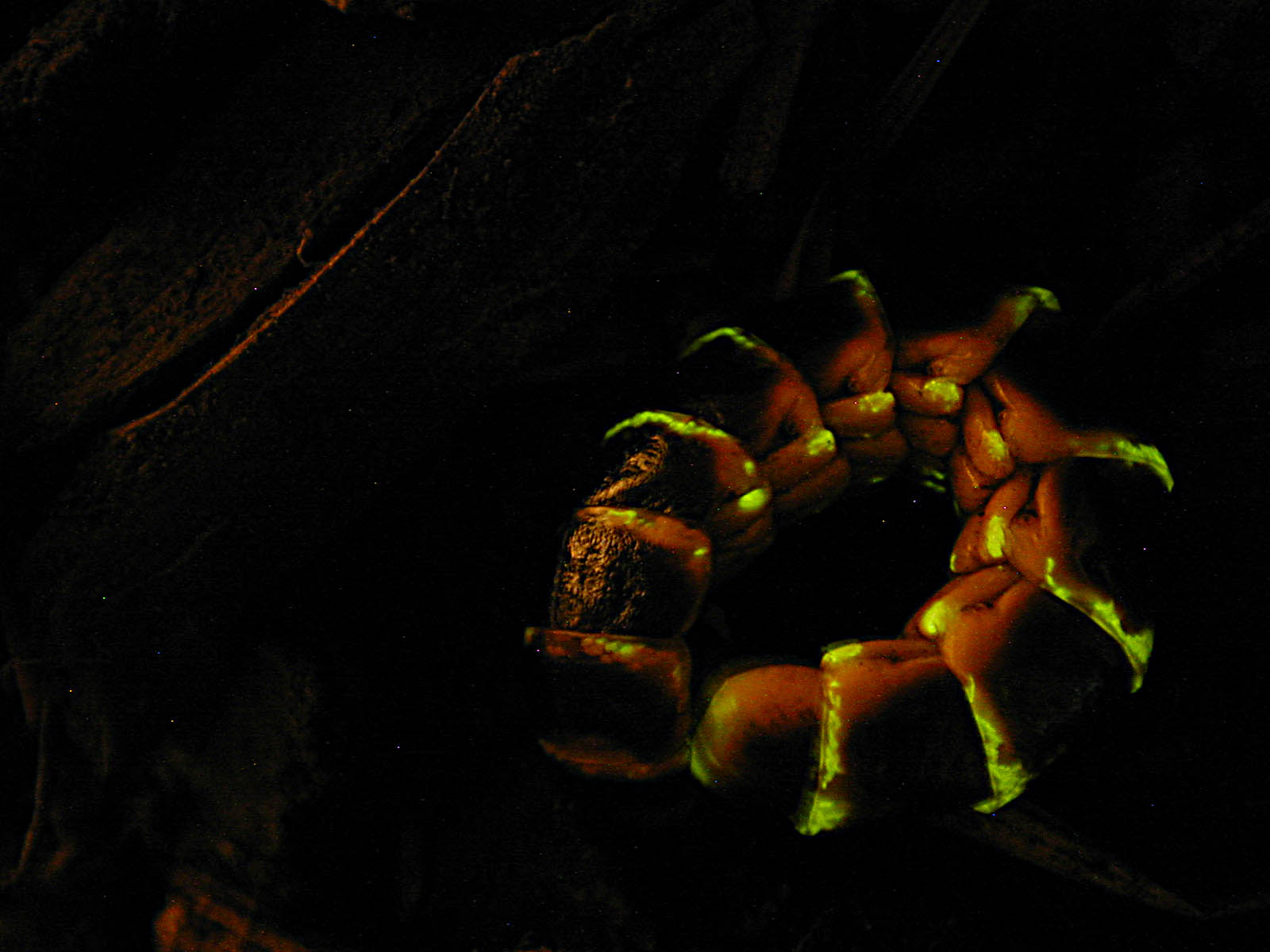
A luminescent larva or female

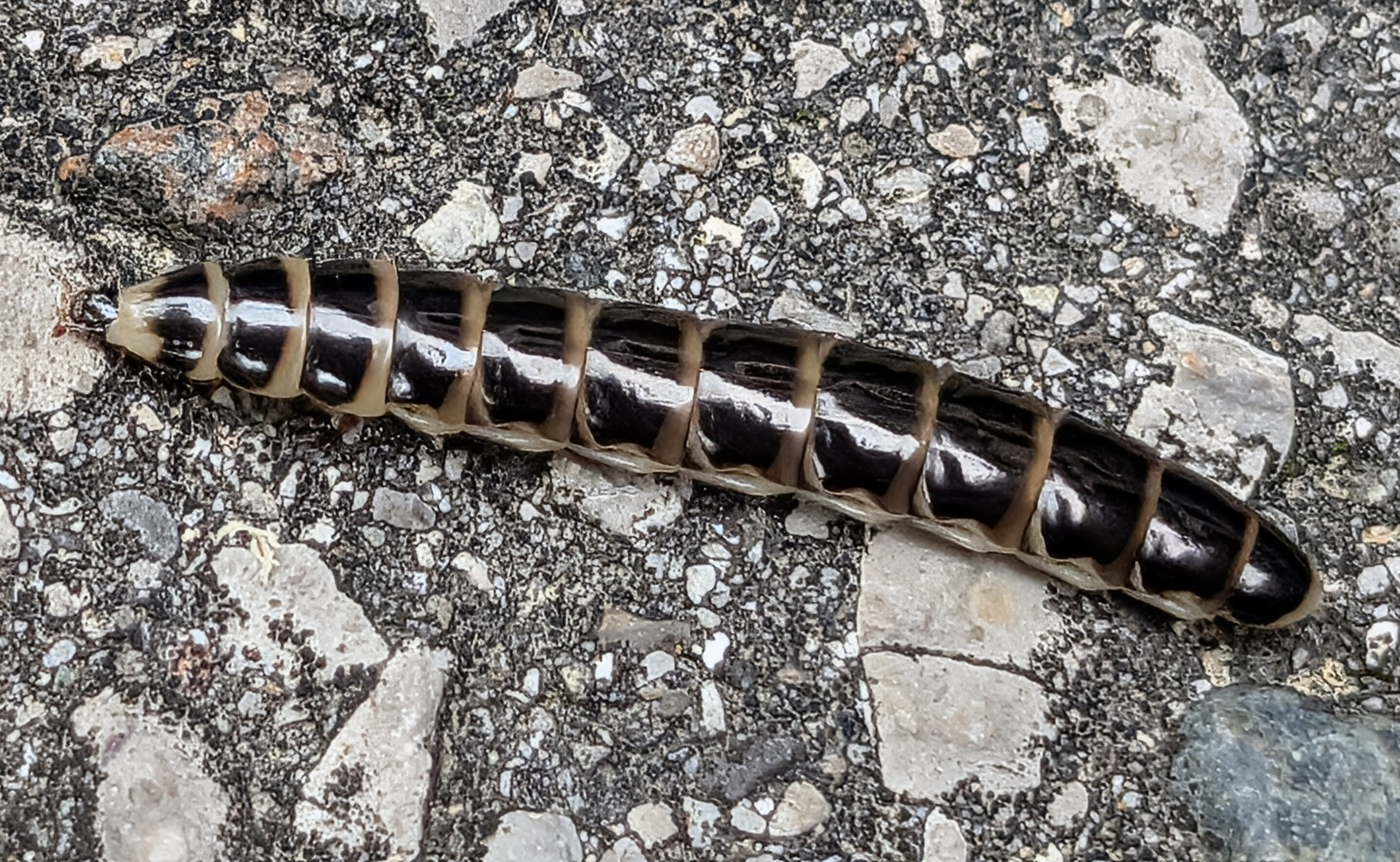
Larva of a beetle of the family Phengodidae

== Genera ==
- Acladocera
- Adendrocera
- Brasilocerus
- Cenophengus
- Cephalophrixothorax
- Cydistus
- Decamastinocerus
- Distremocephalus
- Eurymastinocerus
- Euryognathus
- Euryopa
- Howdenia
- Mastinocerus
- Mastinomorphus
- Mastinowittmerus
- Microcydistus
- Microphengodes
- Neophengus
- Nephromma
- Oxymastinocerus
- Paramastinocerus
- Paraptorthodius
- Penicillophorus
- Phengodes
- Phrixothrix
- Pseudomastinocerus
- Pseudophengodes
- Ptorthodiellus
- Ptorthodius
- Spangleriella
- Steneuryopa
- Stenocladius
- Stenophrixothrix
- Taximastinocerus
- Zarhipis
