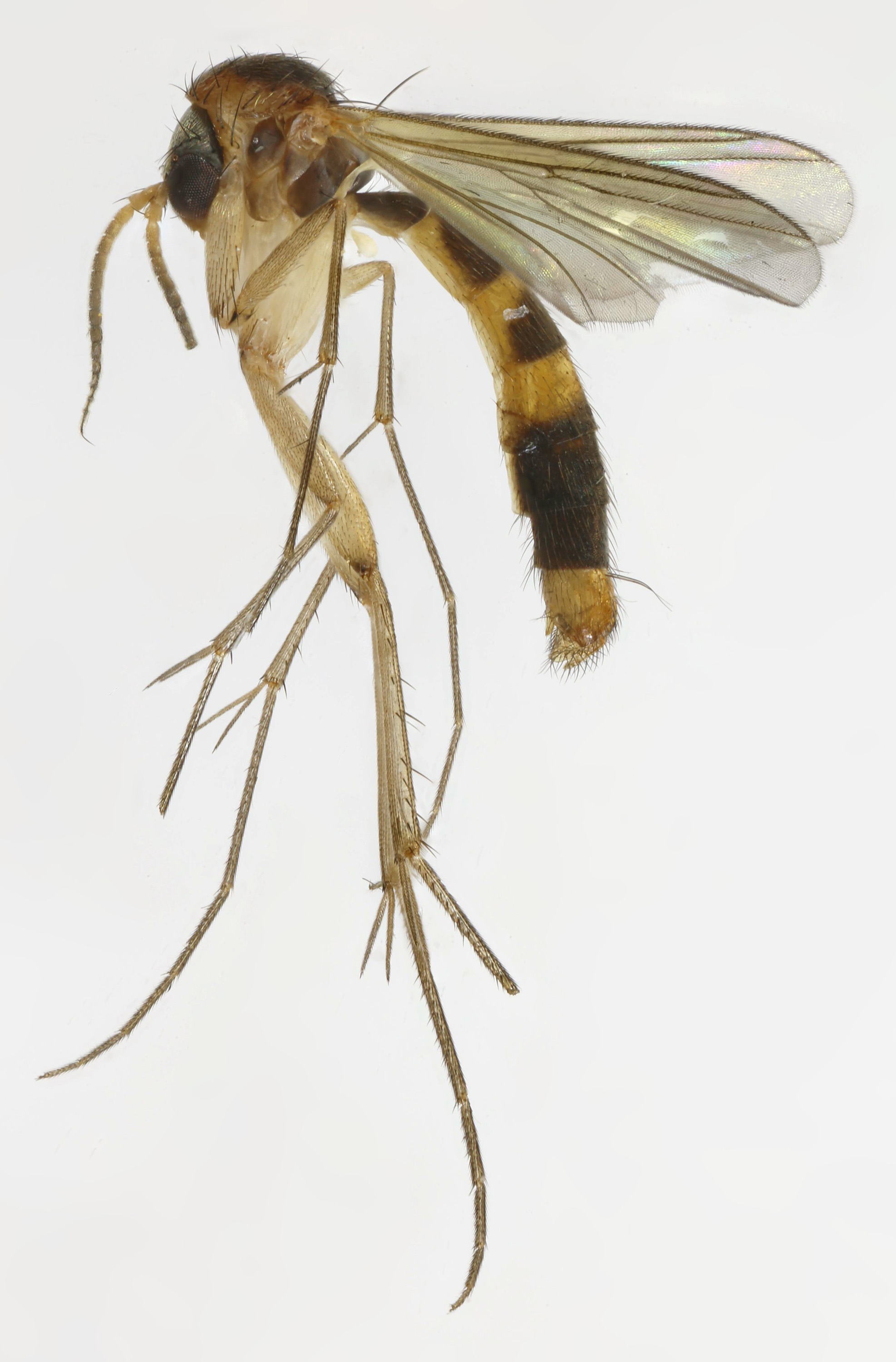
- Allodia

Scientific classification
- Domain: Eukaryota
- Kingdom: Animalia
- Phylum: Arthropoda
- Class: Insecta
- Order: Diptera
- Family: Mycetophilidae
- Subfamily: Mycetophilinae; Newman, 1834

= Mycetophilinae =

Subfamily of insects

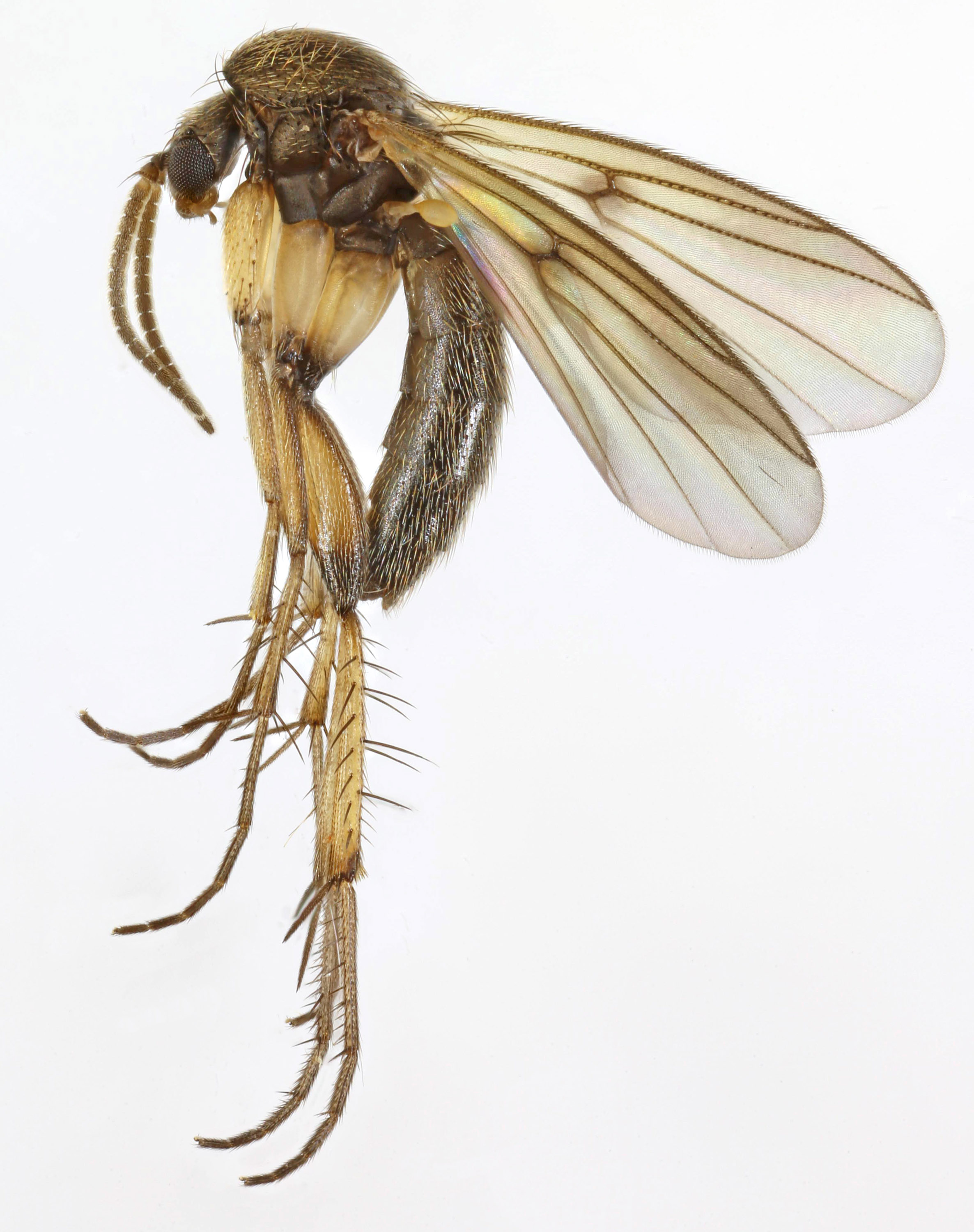
Zygomyia

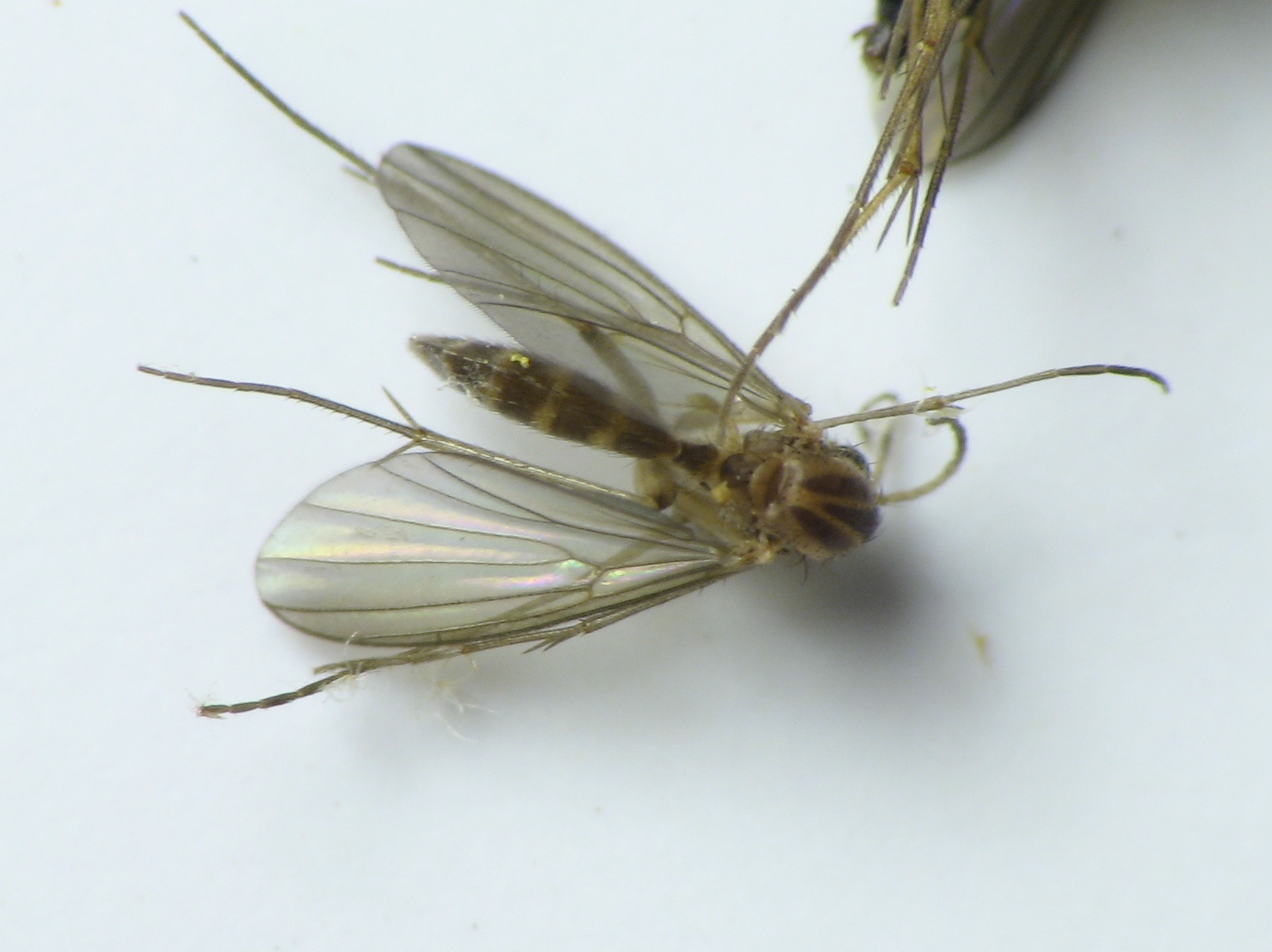
Trichonta

Mycetophilinae is a subfamily of fungus gnats in the family Mycetophilidae. There are more than 30 genera and 2,000 described species in Mycetophilinae. There are two tribes, Exechiini and Mycetophilini.

== Genera ==
These 34 genera belong to the subfamily Mycetophilinae:

- Acadia
- Acnemia
- Acomoptera
- Acomopterella
- Acrodicrania
- Adicroneura
- Aglaomyia Vockeroth, 1980
- Allactoneura
- Allocotocera
- Allodia Winnertz, 1863
- Allodiopsis Tuomikoski, 1966
- Anaclileia
- Anatella Winnertz, 1863
- Aneura
- Anomalomyia
- Apolephthisa
- Arachnocampa
- Asindulum
- Aspidionia Colless, 1966
- Ateleia
- Austrosciophila
- Austrosynapha
- Azana
- Baeopterogyna
- Boletina
- Brachypeza Winnertz, 1863
- Brevicornu Marshall, 1896
- Caladonileia
- Cawthronia
- Cerotelion
- Clastobasis
- Coelophthinia
- Coelosia
- Cordyla Meigen, 1803
- Creagdhubhia
- Cycloneura
- Diadocidia
- Ditomyia
- Docosia
- Drepanocercus
- Dynatosoma Winnertz, 1863
- Dziedzickia
- Ectrepesthoneura
- Epicypta Winnertz, 1863
- Euceroplatus
- Eudicrana
- Exechia Winnertz, 1863
- Exechiopsis Tuomikoski, 1966
- Fenderomyia
- Garrettella
- Gnoriste
- Gracilileia
- Greenomyia
- Grzegorzekia
- Hadroneura
- Hesperodes
- Heteropterna
- Impleta
- Indoleia
- Keroplatus
- Leia
- Leptomorphus
- Loicia
- Lygistorrhina
- Macrobrachius Dziedzicki, 1889
- Macrocera
- Macrorrhyncha
- Manota
- Megalopelma
- Megophthalmidia
- Micromacrocera
- Monoclona
- Morganiella
- Mycetophila Meigen, 1803
- Mycomya
- Myrosia Tuomikoski, 1966
- Neoallocotocera
- Neoaphelomera
- Neoclastobasis
- Neoempheria
- Neotrizygia
- Neuratelia
- Notolopha Tuomikoski, 1966
- Novakia
- Orfelia
- Palaeodocosia
- Paleoplatyura
- Paracycloneura
- Paraleia
- Paramorganiella
- Paratinia
- Paratrizygia
- Parvicellula
- Phoenikiella
- Phronia Winnertz, 1863
- Phthinia
- Platurocypta Enderlein, 1910
- Platyura
- Polylepta
- Pseudalysiina
- Pseudexechia Tuomikoski, 1966
- Pseudobrachypeza Tuomikoski, 1966
- Pseudorymosia
- Rondaniella
- Rymosia Winnertz, 1863
- Saigusaia
- Sceptonia Winnertz, 1863
- Sciophila
- Sigmoleia
- Speolepta
- Stenophragma
- Sticholeia
- Stigmatomeria Tuomikoski, 1966
- Symmerus
- Synapha
- Synplasta Skuse, 1890
- Syntemna
- Tarnania Tuomikoski, 1966
- Tasmanina
- Taxicnemis
- Tetragoneura
- Trichonta Winnertz, 1863
- Trichoterga
- Trizygia
- Xenoplatyura
- Zygomyia Winnertz, 1863
- Zygophronia Edwards, 1928
