= Sciophilinae =

Scientific classification
- Domain: Eukaryota
- Kingdom: Animalia
- Phylum: Arthropoda
- Class: Insecta
- Order: Diptera
- Family: Mycetophilidae
- Subfamily: Sciophilinae; Rondani, 1840

Subfamily of flies

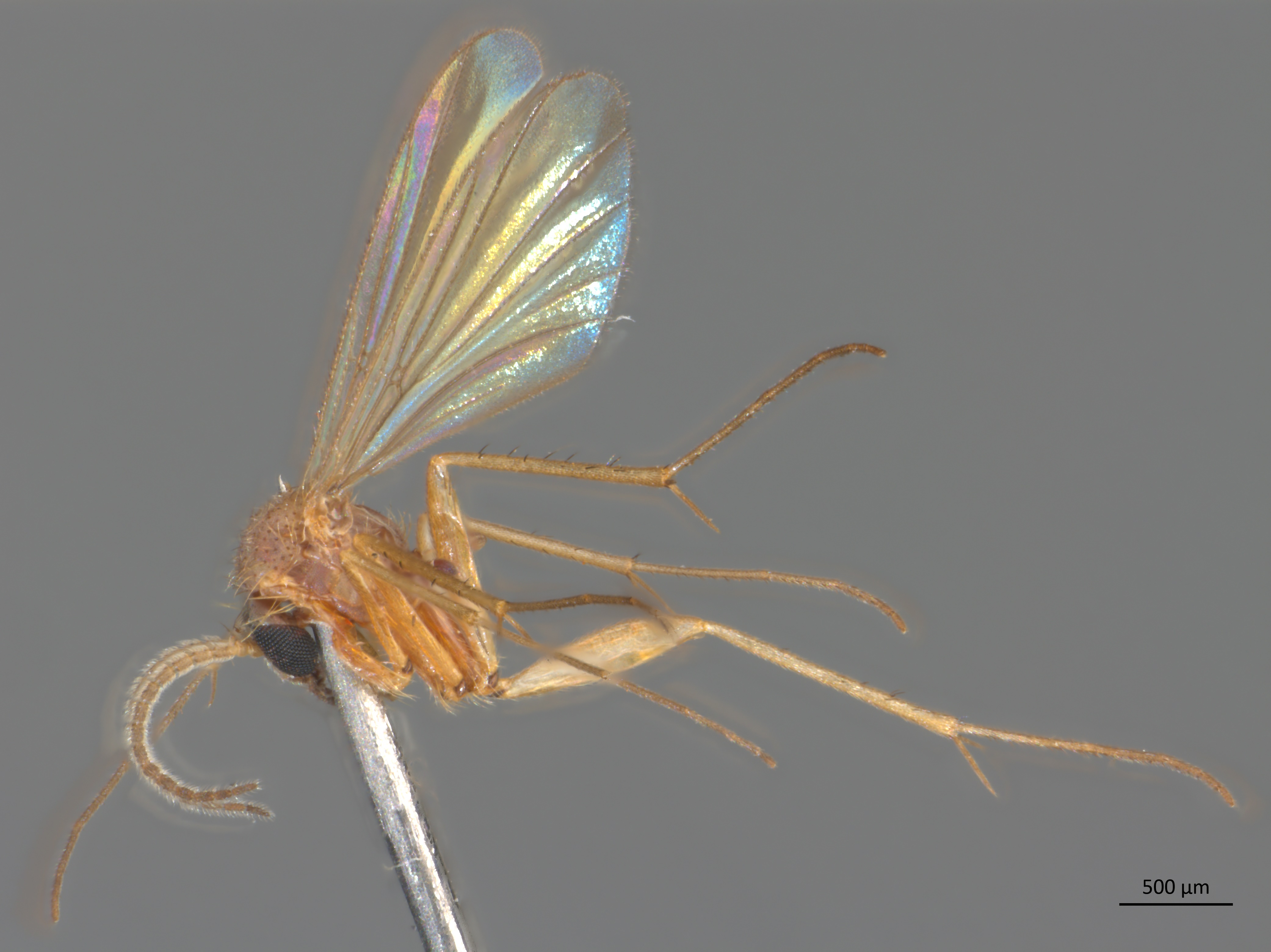
A lateral habitus view of the male Lectotype specimen of the fungus gnat Sciophila fractinervis.

Sciophilinae is a subfamily of fungus gnats (insects in the family Mycetophilidae). There are at least 40 genera and 340 described species in Sciophilinae.

== Genera ==
- Acnemia
- Acomoptera
- Adicroneura
- Aglaomyia
- Allocotocera
- Anaclileia
- Aphrastomyia
- Apolephthisa
- Azana
- Baeopterogyna
- Boletina
- Cluzobra
- Coelophthinia
- Coelosia
- Docosia
- Drepanocerus
- Dziedzickia
- Ectrepesthoneura
- Eudicrana
- Garrettella
- Gnoriste
- Greenomyia
- Hadroneura
- Impleta
- Leia
- Leptomorphus
- Loicia
- Megalopelma
- Megophthalmidia
- Monoclona
- Mycoleia
- Mycomya
- Neoempheria
- Neuratelia
- Novakia
- Paratinia
- Phthinia
- Polylepta
- Rondaniella
- Saigusaia
- Sciophila
- Speolepta
- Stenophragma
- Synapha
- Syntemna
- Tetragoneura
