= Monoclona rufilatera =

Scientific classification
- Kingdom: Animalia
- Phylum: Arthropoda
- Class: Insecta
- Order: Diptera
- Family: Mycetophilidae
- Genus: Monoclona
- Species: M. rufilatera

Binomial name
- Monoclona rufilatera (Walker, 1837)

Synonyms
- Monoclona elegantula Johannsen, 1910; Sciophila rufilatera Walker, 1837

Species of fly

Monoclona rufilatera is a species of fungus gnats in the family Mycetophilidae.
