= Aneura =

Aneura may refer to:

- Aneura (fly), a genus of insects in the family Mycetophilidae
- Aneura (plant), a genus of liverworts in the family Aneuraceae
