= Ateleia (disambiguation) =

Ateleia may refer to:

- Ateleia, a genus of legumes in the family Fabaceae
- Ateleia (fly), a genus of fungus gnats in the family Mycetophilidae
- Ateleia (ancient Greece), an economic term of Ancient Greece
