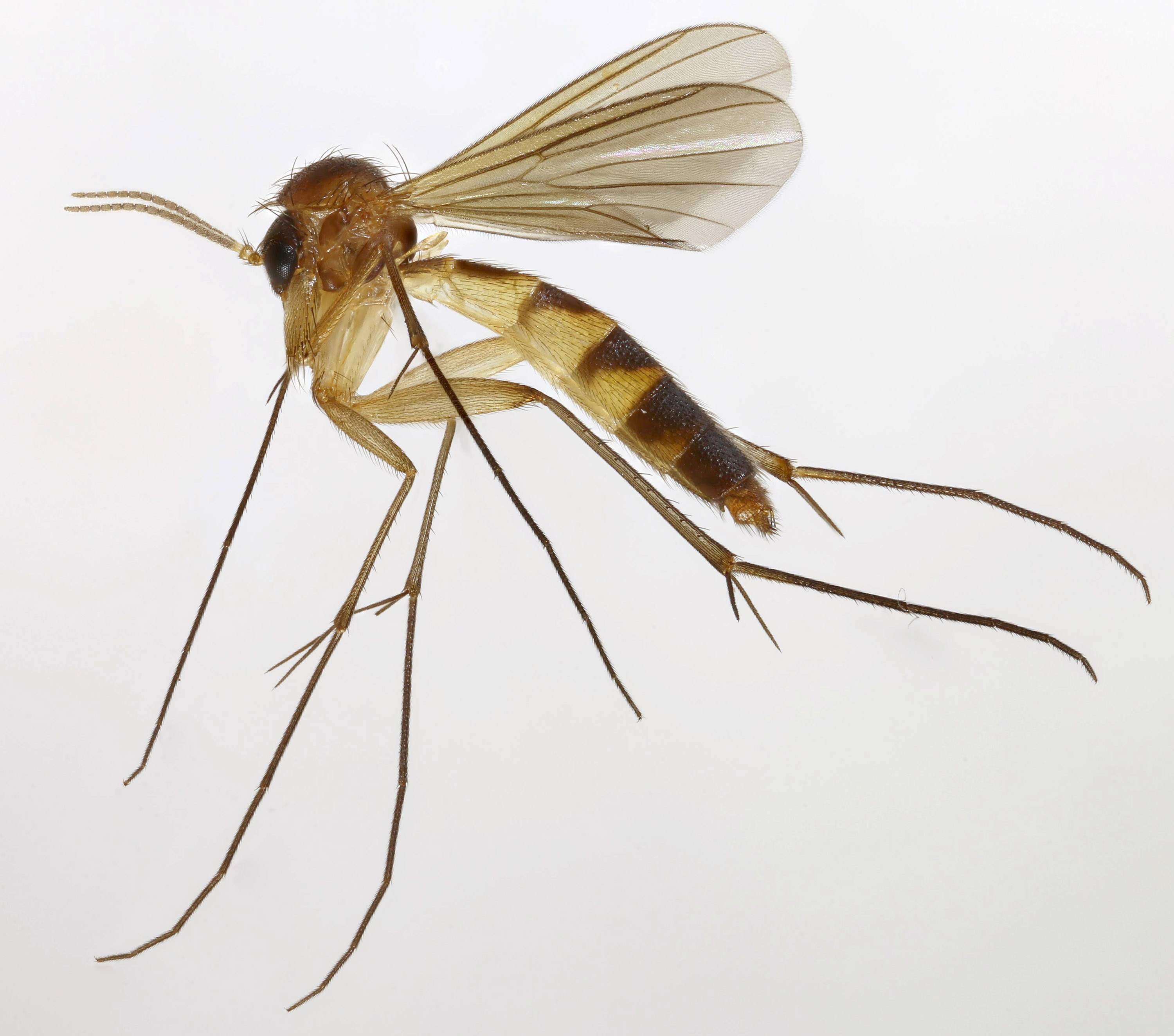

Scientific classification
- Domain: Eukaryota
- Kingdom: Animalia
- Phylum: Arthropoda
- Class: Insecta
- Order: Diptera
- Family: Mycetophilidae
- Subfamily: Mycetophilinae
- Tribe: Exechiini
- Genus: Exechiopsis; Tuomikoski, 1966

= Exechiopsis =

Genus of flies

Exechiopsis is a genus of fungus gnats in the family Mycetophilidae.

== Species ==
- Exechiopsis Tuomikoski, 1966
  E. aemula Plassmann, 1984
  E. angulosa Ostroverkhova, 1979
  E. argillacea Ostroverkhova, 1979
  E. belogorskii Subbotina & Maximova, 2011
  E. biseta Zaitzev, 1999
  E. calceolata Ostroverkhova, 1979
  E. clypeata (Lundstrom, 1911)
  E. coremura (Edwards, 1928)
  E. corona Chandler & Ribeiro, 1995
  E. distendens (Lackschewitz, 1937)
  E. dryaspagensis Chandler, 1977)
  E. dumitrescae (Burghele Balacesco, 1972)
  E. evidens Ostroverkhova, 1979
  E. fimbriata (Lundström, 1909)
  E. forcipata (Lackschewitz, 1937)
  E. furcata (Lundström, 1911)
  E. furiosa Plassmann, 1984
  E. graphica (Plassmann, 1978)
  E. grassatura (Plassmann, 1978)
  E. hammi (Edwards, 1925)
  E. indecisa (Walker, 1856)
  E. ingrica (Stackelberg, 1948)
  E. intersecta (Meigen, 1818)
  E. januarii (Lundstrom, 1913)
  E. jenkinsoni (Edwards, 1925)
  E. lackschewitziana (Stackelberg, 1948)
  E. landrocki (Lundstrom, 1912)
  E. leptoclada Wu & Zheng, 2001
  E. ligulata (Lundström, 1913)
  E. magnicauda (Lundström, 1911)
  E. maritima Ostroverkhova, 1979
  E. multiloba Ostroverkhova, 1979
  E. muscariforma Wu & Zheng, 2001
  E. mycenae Sasakawa & Ishizaki, 1999
  E. neofimbriata Zaitzev, 1999
  E. oltenica (Burghele-Balacesco, 1965)
  E. pachyoda Wu & Zheng, 2001
  E. patula (Plassmann, 1978)
  E. porrecta Ostroverkhova, 1977
  E. pseudindecisa Laštovka & Matile, 1974
  E. pseudofimbriata Zaitzev, 1999
  E. pseudopulchella (Lundstrom, 1912)
  E. pulchella (Winnertz, 1863)
  E. quadridentata Sasakawa & Ishizaki, 1999
  E. sagittata Sasakawa & Ishizaki, 1999
  E. sanageyamana Sasakawa & Ishizaki, 1999
  E. setosa Ostroverkhova, 1979
  E. sichuanensis Wu & Zheng, 2001
  E. subulata (Winnertz, 1863)
  E. tricholomatae Sasakawa & Ishizaki, 1999
  E. triseta Tollet, 1955
  E. unguiculata (Lundström, 1911)
  E. vizzavonensis (Edwards, 1929)
  E. wanawarica Ostroverkhova, 1979
  E. yumikoae Sasakawa & Ishizaki, 1999
- Xenexechia Tuomikoski, 1966
  E. aculeata Ostroverkhova, 1979
  E. atlantis (Stora, 1948)
  E. bifida (Freeman, 1951)
  E. brevifurcata (Freeman, 1951)
  E. crucigera (Lundström, 1909)
  E. davatchii (Matile, 1969)
  E. extensa (Freeman, 1951)
  E. funerea (Freeman, 1951)
  E. furcilla (Freeman, 1954)
  E. kaszabi Lastovka & Matile, 1974
  E. leptura (Meigen, 1830)
  E. membranacea (Lundström, 1912)
  E. palettata (Burghele-Balacesco, 1965)
  E. perspiqua (Johannsen, 1912)
  E. pollicata (Edwards, 1925)
  E. praedita Plassmann, 1976
  E. pruinosa Lastovka & Matile, 1974
  E. seducta (Plassmann, 1976)
  E. setigera (Freeman, 1951)
  E. stylata Lastovka & Matile, 1974
  E. truncata (Freeman, 1951)
  E. vasculiforma Kurina, 2008
