= Brevicornu =

Scientific classification
- Domain: Eukaryota
- Kingdom: Animalia
- Phylum: Arthropoda
- Class: Insecta
- Order: Diptera
- Family: Mycetophilidae
- Subfamily: Mycetophilinae
- Tribe: Exechiini
- Genus: Brevicornu; Marshall, 1896

Genus of flies

Brevicornu is a genus of flies belonging to the family Mycetophilidae.

The genus has cosmopolitan distribution.

Species:

- Brevicornu affinis Zaitzev, 1988
- Brevicornu amplum Blagoderov, 1992
- Brevicornu foliatum (Edwards, 1925)
