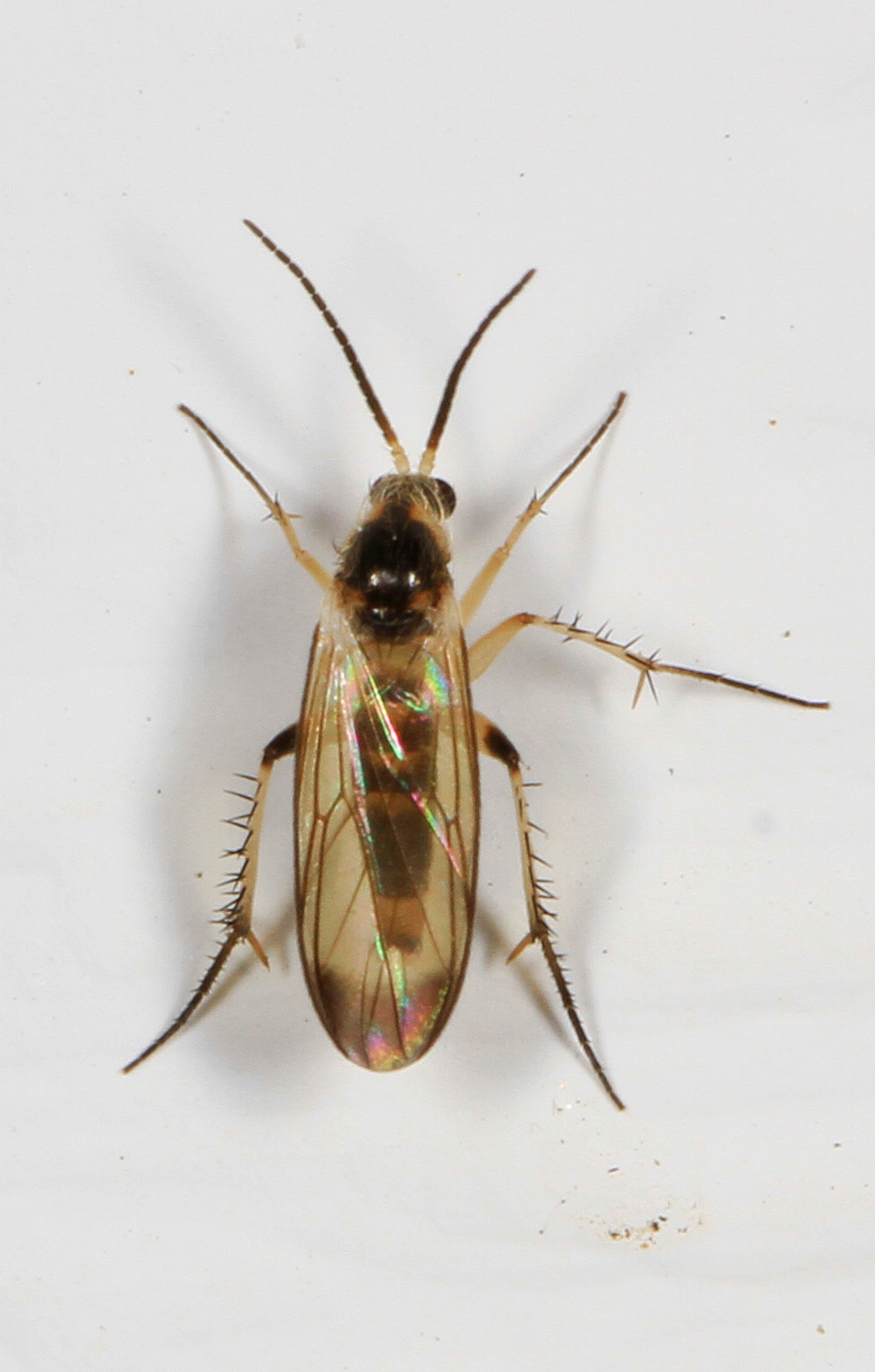
- Rondaniella dimidiata

Scientific classification
- Kingdom: Animalia
- Phylum: Arthropoda
- Class: Insecta
- Order: Diptera
- Family: Mycetophilidae
- Subfamily: Leiinae; Edwards, 1925

= Leiinae =

Subfamily of flies

Leiinae is a subfamily of fungus gnats in the family Mycetophilidae. There are at least 4 genera in Leiinae.

== Genera ==
- Greenomyia
- Leia
- Rondaniella
