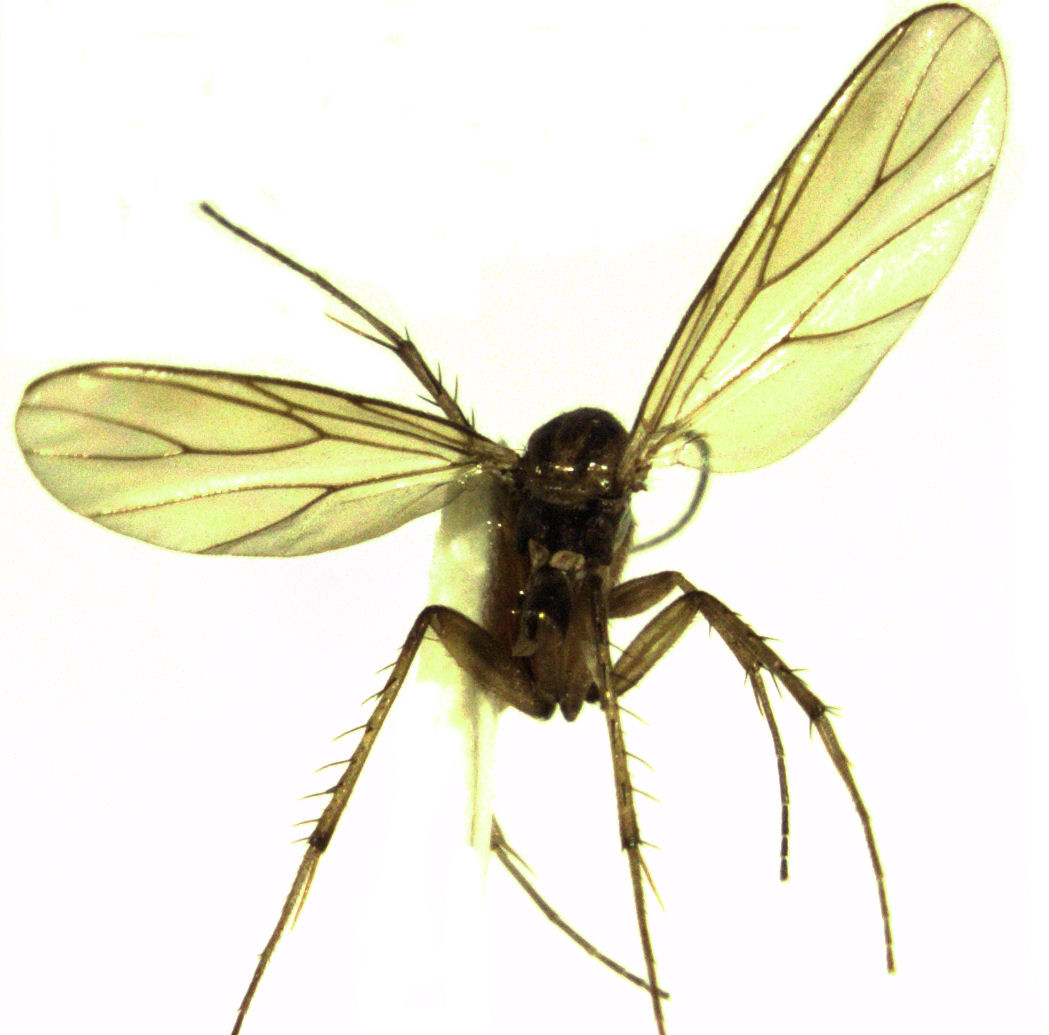
- adult Anomalomyia guttata, abdomen missing

Scientific classification
- Kingdom: Animalia
- Phylum: Arthropoda
- Class: Insecta
- Order: Diptera
- Family: Mycetophilidae
- Subfamily: Mycetophilinae
- Genus: Anomalomyia; Hutton, 1904

Type species
- Mycetophila guttata Hutton, 1881

Synonyms
- Anomala Marshall, 1896

= Anomalomyia =

Genus of flies

Anomalomyia is a genus of fly belonging to the family Mycetophilidae.

== Species ==
- Anomalomyia affinis Tonnoir & Edwards, 1927
- Anomalomyia basalis Tonnoir & Edwards, 1927
- Anomalomyia flavicauda Tonnoir & Edwards, 1927
- Anomalomyia guttata (Hutton, 1881)
- Anomalomyia immaculata Tonnoir & Edwards, 1927
- Anomalomyia intermedia Matile, 1993
- Anomalomyia minor (Marshall, 1896)
- Anomalomyia nasuta Matile, 1993
- Anomalomyia obscura Tonnoir & Edwards, 1927
- Anomalomyia picta Matile, 1993
- Anomalomyia subobscura Tonnoir & Edwards, 1927
- Anomalomyia thompsoni Tonnoir & Edwards, 1927
- Anomalomyia viatoris Tonnoir & Edwards, 1927
