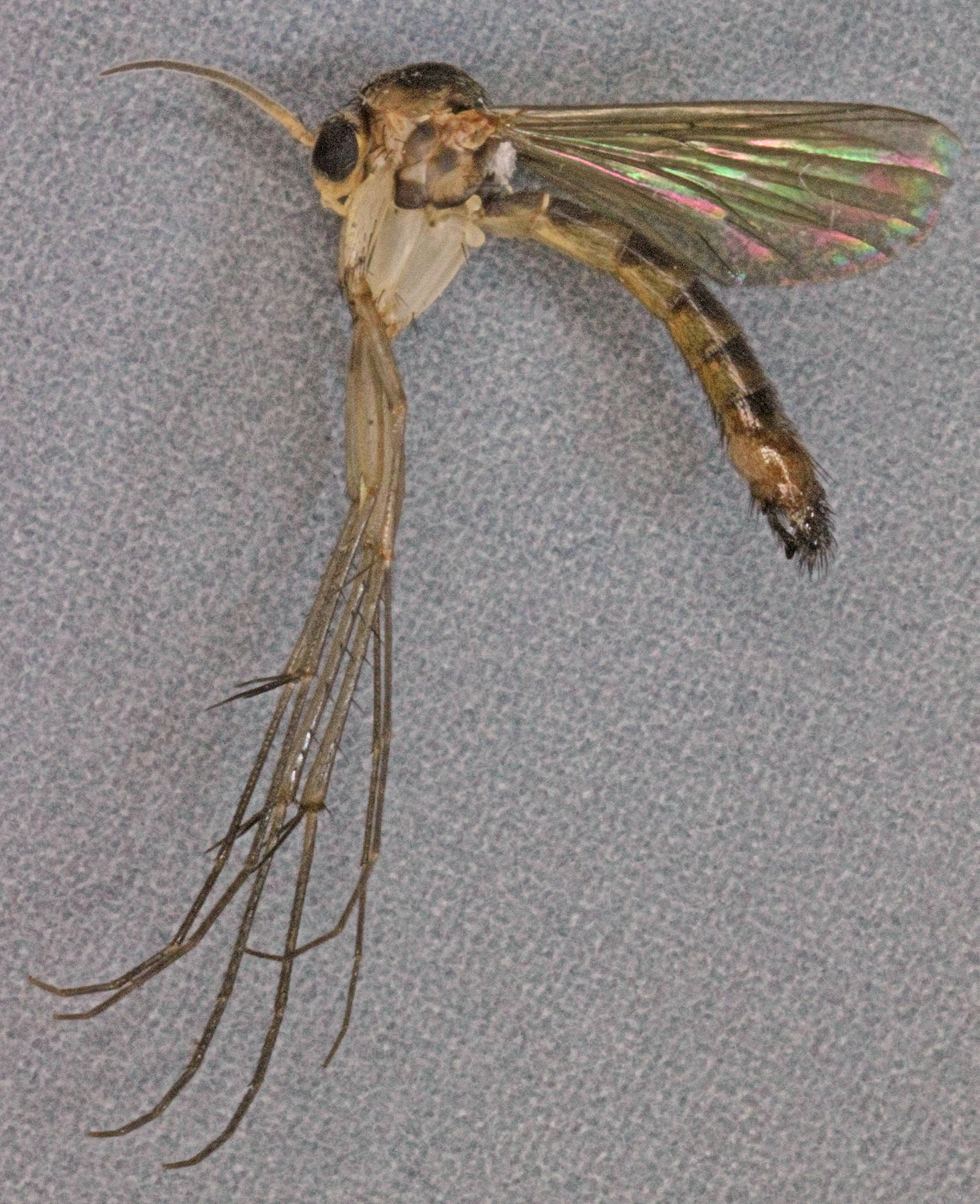
- Allodiopsis rustica

Scientific classification
- Domain: Eukaryota
- Kingdom: Animalia
- Phylum: Arthropoda
- Class: Insecta
- Order: Diptera
- Family: Mycetophilidae
- Subfamily: Mycetophilinae
- Tribe: Exechiini
- Genus: Allodiopsis; Tuomikoski, 1966

Type species
- Rhymosia rustica Edwards, 1941

= Allodiopsis =

Genus of flies

Allodiopsis is a genus of fungus gnats belonging to the family Mycetophilidae.

The genus was described in 1966 by Risto Kalevi Tuomikoski.

The species of this genus are found in Eurasia and Northern America.

== Species ==
- Allodiopsis adumbrata Zaitzev, 1982
- Allodiopsis bayardi Matile, 1971
- Allodiopsis cinerea Freeman, 1951
- Allodiopsis composita Ostroverkhova, 1979
- Allodiopsis gracai Ševcik & Papp, 2003
- Allodiopsis korolevi Zaitzev, 1982
- Allodiopsis orientalis Zaitzev, 1993
- Allodiopsis pseudodmestica (Lackschewitz, 1937)
- Rhymosia rustica Edwards, 1941
