= Creagdhubhia =

Scientific classification
- Domain: Eukaryota
- Kingdom: Animalia
- Phylum: Arthropoda
- Class: Insecta
- Order: Diptera
- Family: Mycetophilidae
- Genus: Creagdhubhia; Chandler, 1999
- Species: C. mallochorum

Binomial name
- Creagdhubhia mallochorum Chandler, 1999

Genus of flies

Creagdhubhia is a monotypic genus of flies belonging to the family Mycetophilidae. The only species is Creagdhubhia mallochorum.

The species is found in Europe.
