= Acomoptera =

Scientific classification
- Kingdom: Animalia
- Phylum: Arthropoda
- Class: Insecta
- Order: Diptera
- Family: Mycetophilidae
- Genus: Acomoptera; Vockeroth, 1980

Genus of flies

Acomoptera is a genus of flies belonging to the family Mycetophilidae.

The species of this genus are found in Europe and Northern America.

Species:

- Acomoptera crispa Kerr, 2011
- Acomoptera digitata Kerr, 2011
