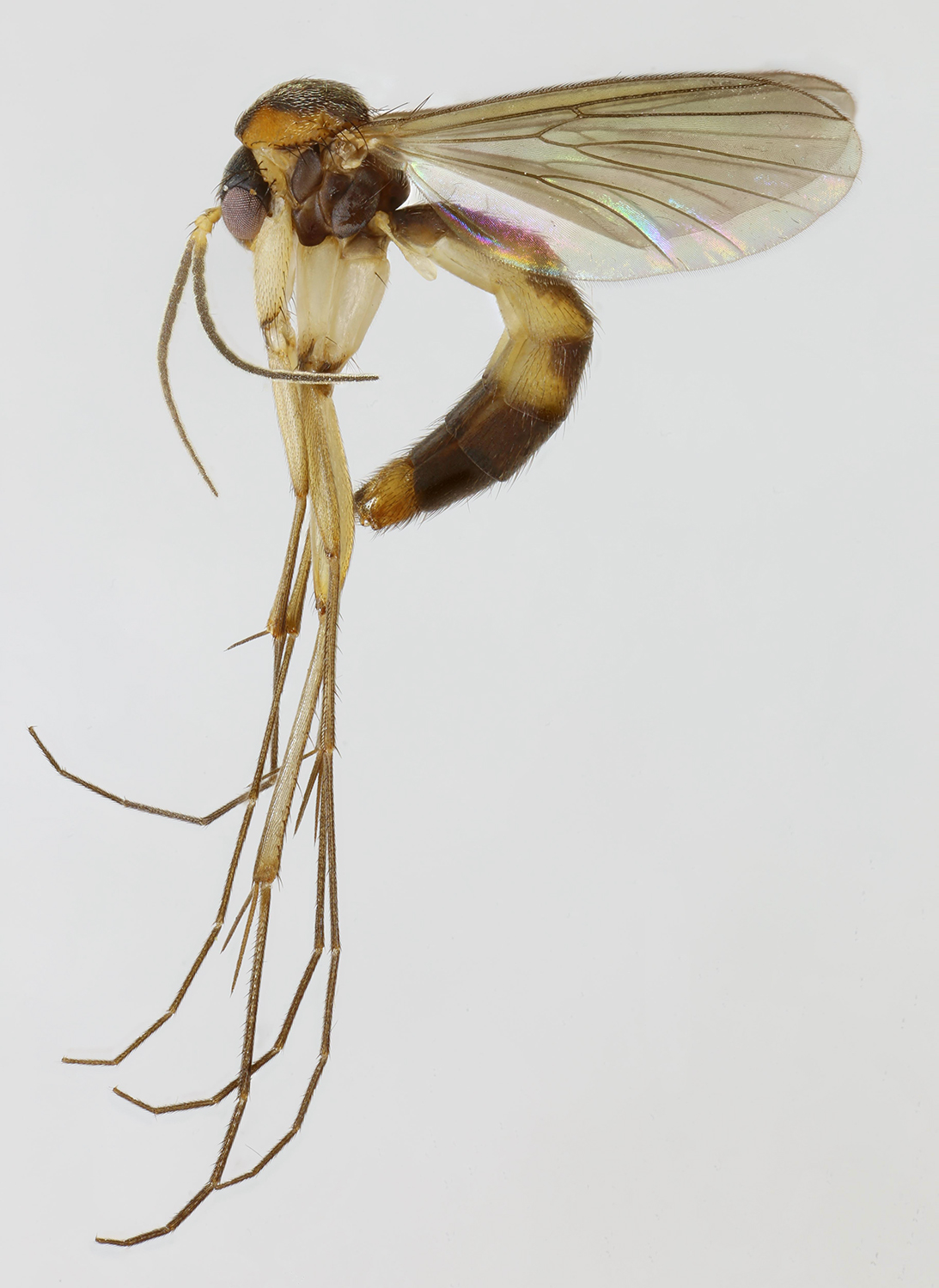
- Allodia lundstroemi

Scientific classification
- Kingdom: Animalia
- Phylum: Arthropoda
- Clade: Pancrustacea
- Class: Insecta
- Order: Diptera
- Family: Mycetophilidae
- Tribe: Exechiini
- Genus: Allodia; Winnertz, 1863

Synonyms
- Parallodia Plassmann, 1969

= Allodia =

Genus of flies

Allodia is a genus of fungus gnat belonging to the family Mycetophilidae.

The genus was described in 1863 by Winnertz.

The genus has cosmopolitan distribution.

Selected species:

- Allodia ablata Zaitzev, 1984
- Allodia actuaria Johannsen, 1912
- Allodia aculeata Zaitzev, 1984
- Allodia adunca Zaitzev, 1992
- Allodia anglofennica Edwards, 1921
- Allodia angustilobata Zaitzev, 1984
- Allodia antennata Harrison, 1964
- Allodia auriculatum Edwards, 1925
