= Monoclona =

Scientific classification
- Domain: Eukaryota
- Kingdom: Animalia
- Phylum: Arthropoda
- Class: Insecta
- Order: Diptera
- Family: Mycetophilidae
- Subfamily: Sciophilinae
- Genus: Monoclona; Mik, 1886

Genus of flies

Monoclona is a genus of fungus gnats in the family Mycetophilidae. There are about 18 described species in Monoclona.

== Species ==
These 18 species belong to the genus Monoclona:

- Monoclona abnormalis Fisher, 1939^{c g}
- Monoclona atrata Strobl, 1898^{c g}
- Monoclona bicolor Enderlein, 1910^{c g}
- Monoclona conspicua Zaitzev, 1983^{i c g}
- Monoclona digitata Edwards, 1940^{c g}
- Monoclona floridensis Fisher, 1946^{i c g}
- Monoclona forcipata Strobl, 1909^{c g}
- Monoclona furcata Johannsen, 1910^{i c g}
- Monoclona laosilvatica Sevcik, 2001^{c g}
- Monoclona maculata Edwards, 1933^{c g}
- Monoclona mikii Kertész, 1898^{c g}
- Monoclona nigriventris Edwards, 1940^{c g}
- Monoclona orientalis Zaitzev, 1983^{c g}
- Monoclona rufilatera (Walker, 1837)^{i c g b}
- Monoclona silvatica Zaitzev, 1983^{c g}
- Monoclona simplex Garrett, 1925^{i c g}
- Monoclona tapicarei Lane, 1952^{c g}
- Monoclona trifasciata Edwards, 1940^{c g}

Data sources: i = ITIS, c = Catalogue of Life, g = GBIF, b = Bugguide.net
