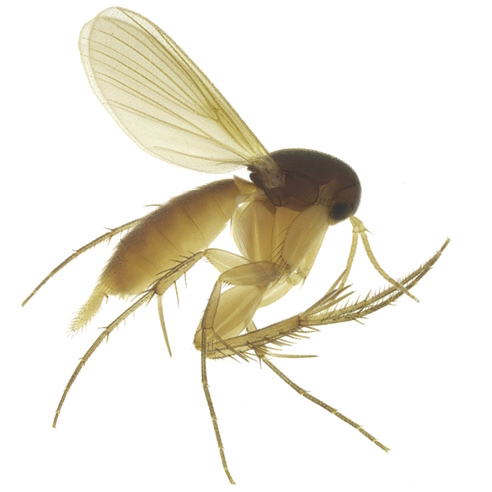
- Epicypta scatophora

Scientific classification
- Kingdom: Animalia
- Phylum: Arthropoda
- Clade: Pancrustacea
- Class: Insecta
- Order: Diptera
- Family: Mycetophilidae
- Genus: Epicypta; Winnertz, 1863

Synonyms
- Allophallus Dziedzicki, 1923

= Epicypta =

Genus of flies

Epicypta is a genus of flies belonging to the family Mycetophilidae.

The genus has a cosmopolitan distribution.

== Species ==
Species:

- Epicypta acuminata Wu, He & Yang, 1998
- Epicypta aczeli Lane, 1958
- Epicypta aguarensis Lane, 1951
