= Tarnania =

Scientific classification
- Domain: Eukaryota
- Kingdom: Animalia
- Phylum: Arthropoda
- Class: Insecta
- Order: Diptera
- Family: Mycetophilidae
- Tribe: Exechiini
- Genus: Tarnania; Tuomikoski, 1966

Genus of flies

Tarnania is a genus of flies belonging to the family Mycetophilidae.

The species of this genus are found in Eurasia and Northern America.

Species:

- Tarnania dziedzickii (Edwards, 1941)
- Tarnania fenestralis (Meigen, 1818)
