= Aneura (fly) =

Scientific classification
- Domain: Eukaryota
- Kingdom: Animalia
- Phylum: Arthropoda
- Class: Insecta
- Order: Diptera
- Family: Mycetophilidae
- Subfamily: Mycetophilinae
- Genus: Aneura; Marshall, 1896

Species
- Aneura jaschhofi; Aneura tonnoiri

Genus of flies

Aneura is a genus of flies in the family Mycetophilidae.
