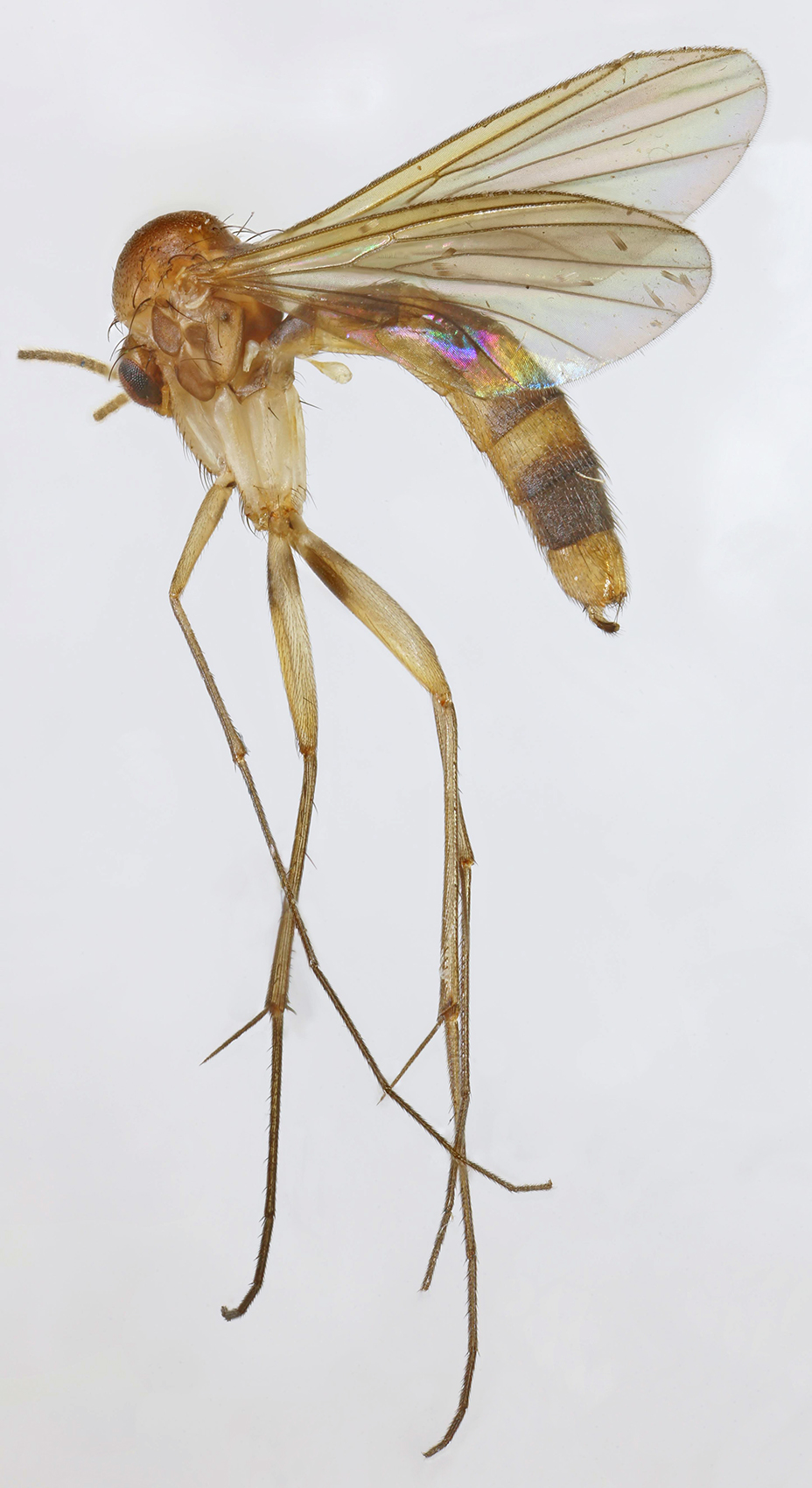
- Rymosia placida

Scientific classification
- Domain: Eukaryota
- Kingdom: Animalia
- Phylum: Arthropoda
- Class: Insecta
- Order: Diptera
- Family: Mycetophilidae
- Tribe: Exechiini
- Genus: Rymosia; Winnertz, 1863

= Rymosia =

Genus of flies

Rymosia is a genus of flies belonging to the family Mycetophilidae.

The species of this genus are found in Europe, Russia, Japan and America.

Species:

- Palaeoepicypta longicalcar (Meunier, 1904)
- Rhymosia foersteri (Theobald, 1937)
