= Allactoneura =

- Illustration of male holotype specimen of Allactoneura veiti

Scientific classification
- Kingdom: Animalia
- Phylum: Arthropoda
- Class: Insecta
- Order: Diptera
- Family: Mycetophilidae
- Genus: Allactoneura; De Meijere, 1907

Genus of flies

Allactoneura is a genus of flies belonging to the family Mycetophilidae.

The species of this genus are found in Europe, Southeastern Asia and Southern Africa.

Species:

- Allactoneura akasakana Sasakawa, 2005
- Allactoneura argentosquamosa (Enderlein, 1910)
