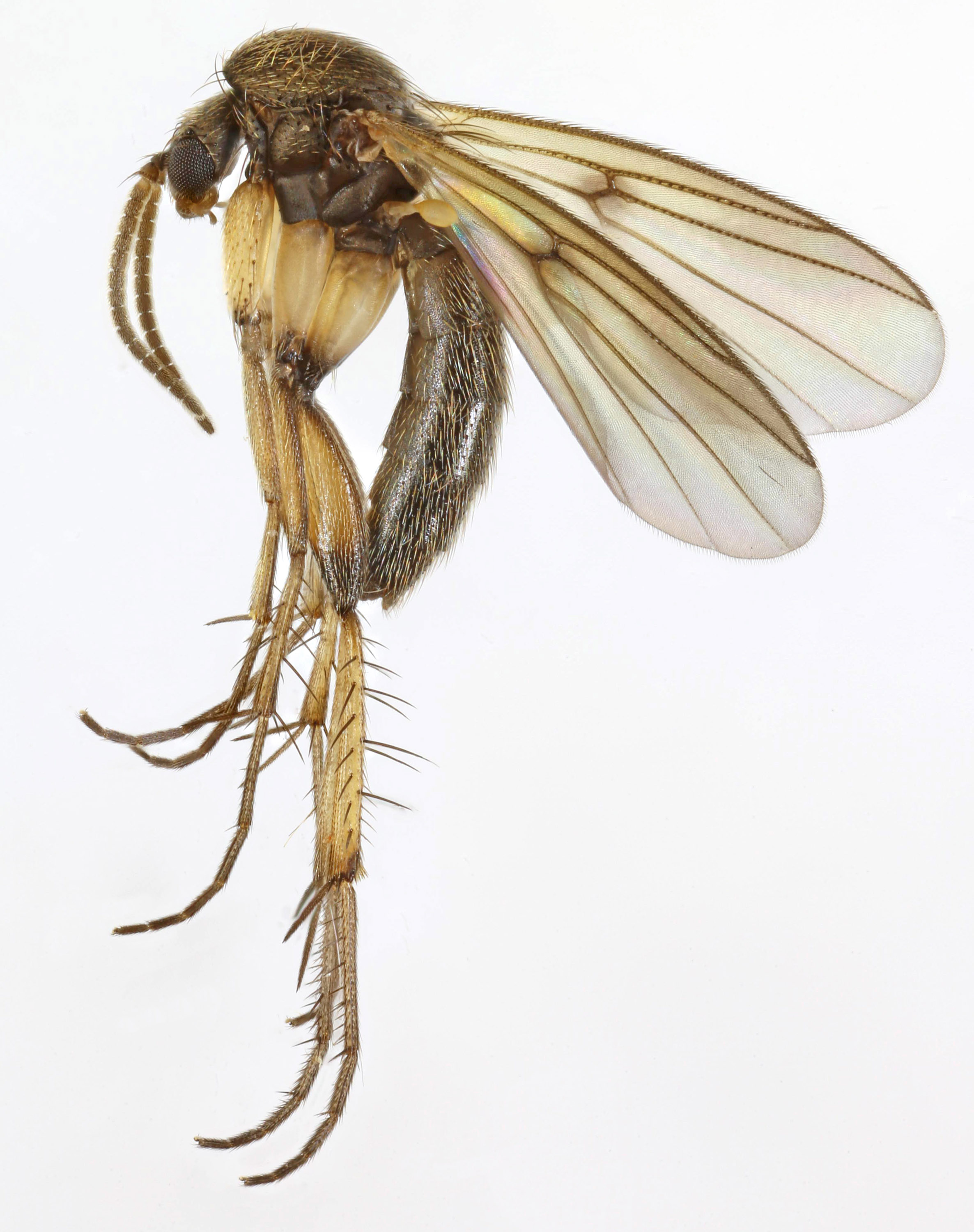

Scientific classification
- Kingdom: Animalia
- Phylum: Arthropoda
- Class: Insecta
- Order: Diptera
- Family: Mycetophilidae
- Tribe: Mycetophilini
- Genus: Zygomyia; Winnertz, 1863

= Zygomyia =

Genus of flies

Zygomyia is a genus of fungus gnats in the family Mycetophilidae. There are at least 80 described species in Zygomyia.

== Species ==
These 84 species belong to the genus Zygomyia:

- Zygomyia acuta Tonnoir & Edwards, 1927^{c g}
- Zygomyia adpressa Wu & Wang, 2008^{c g}
- Zygomyia aguarensis Lane, 1951^{c g}
- Zygomyia aino Okada, 1939^{c g}
- Zygomyia albinotata Tonnoir & Edwards, 1927^{c g}
- Zygomyia angusta Plassmann, 1977^{c g}
- Zygomyia apicalis Tonnoir & Edwards, 1927^{c g}
- Zygomyia argentina Lane, 1961^{c g}
- Zygomyia aurantiaca Edwards, 1934^{c g}
- Zygomyia bicolor Edwards, 1934^{c g}
- Zygomyia bifasciata Garrett, 1925^{i c g}
- Zygomyia bifasciola Matile, 1989^{c g}
- Zygomyia bivittata Tonnoir & Edwards, 1927^{c g}
- Zygomyia brasiliana Lane, 1947^{c g}
- Zygomyia brunnea Tonnoir & Edwards, 1927^{c g}
- Zygomyia calvusa Wu, 1999^{c g}
- Zygomyia chavantesi Lane, 1951^{c g}
- Zygomyia christata Garrett, 1925^{i c g}
- Zygomyia christulata Garrett, 1925^{i c g}
- Zygomyia costata Tonnoir & Edwards, 1927^{c g}
- Zygomyia coxalis Garrett, 1925^{i c g}
- Zygomyia crassicauda Tonnoir & Edwards, 1927^{c g}
- Zygomyia crassipyga Tonnoir & Edwards, 1927^{c g}
- Zygomyia diffusa Tonnoir, 1927^{c g}
- Zygomyia diplocercusa Wu & Wang, 2008^{c g}
- Zygomyia distincta Tonnoir & Edwards, 1927^{c g}
- Zygomyia egmontensis Zaitzev, 2002^{c g}
- Zygomyia eluta Tonnoir & Edwards, 1927^{c g}
- Zygomyia filigera Edwards, 1927^{c g}
- Zygomyia flavicoxa Marshall, 1896^{c g}
- Zygomyia flaviventris Winnertz, 1863^{c g}
- Zygomyia freemani Lane, 1951^{c g}
- Zygomyia golbachi Lane, 1961^{c g}
- Zygomyia grisescens Tonnoir & Edwards, 1927^{c g}
- Zygomyia guttata Tonnoir & Edwards, 1927^{c g}
- Zygomyia heros Lane, 1951^{c g}
- Zygomyia herteli Lane, 1951^{c g}
- Zygomyia humeralis (Wiedemann, 1817)^{c g}
- Zygomyia ignobilis Loew, 1869^{i c g}
- Zygomyia immaculata Tonnoir & Edwards, 1927^{c g}
- Zygomyia insipinosa Tonnoir & Edwards, 1927^{c g}
- Zygomyia interrupta Malloch, 1914^{i c g}
- Zygomyia jakovlevi Zaitzev, 1989^{c g}
- Zygomyia kiddi Chandler, 1991^{c g}
- Zygomyia kurilensis Zaitzev, 1989^{c g}
- Zygomyia longicauda Tonnoir & Edwards, 1927^{c g}
- Zygomyia marginata Tonnoir & Edwards, 1927^{c g}
- Zygomyia matilei Caspers, 1980^{c g}
- Zygomyia modesta Lane, 1948^{c g}
- Zygomyia multiseta Zaitzev, 2002^{c g}
- Zygomyia nigrita Tonnoir & Edwards, 1927^{c g}
- Zygomyia nigriventris Tonnoir & Edwards, 1927^{c g}
- Zygomyia nigrohalterata Tonnoir & Edwards, 1927^{c g}
- Zygomyia notata (Stannius, 1831)^{c g}
- Zygomyia obsoleta Tonnoir & Edwards, 1927^{c g}
- Zygomyia ornata Loew, 1869^{i c g}
- Zygomyia ornatipennis Lane, 1948^{c g}
- Zygomyia ovata Zaitzev, 2002^{c g}
- Zygomyia penicillata Tonnoir & Edwards, 1927^{c g}
- Zygomyia pictipennis (Staeger, 1840)^{c g}
- Zygomyia pilosa Garrett, 1925^{i c g}
- Zygomyia planitarsata Becker, 1908^{c g}
- Zygomyia plaumanni Lane, 1951^{c g}
- Zygomyia polyspina Bechev, 1994^{c g}
- Zygomyia pseudohumeralis Caspers, 1980^{c g}
- Zygomyia ruficollis Tonnoir & Edwards, 1927^{c g}
- Zygomyia rufithorax Tonnoir & Edwards, 1927^{c g}
- Zygomyia setosa Barendrecht, 1938^{c g}
- Zygomyia similis Tonnoir & Edwards, 1927^{c g}
- Zygomyia simplex Strobl, 1895^{c g}
- Zygomyia submarginata Harrison, 1955^{c g}
- Zygomyia tapuiai Lane, 1951^{c g}
- Zygomyia taranakiensis Zaitzev, 2002^{c g}
- Zygomyia trifasciata Tonnoir & Edwards, 1927^{c g}
- Zygomyia trispinosa Zaitzev, 2002^{c g}
- Zygomyia truncata Tonnoir, 1927^{c g}
- Zygomyia unica Ostroverkhova, 1979^{c g}
- Zygomyia unispinosa Tonnoir, 1927^{c g}
- Zygomyia valepedro Chandler, 1991^{c g}
- Zygomyia valeriae Chandler, 1991^{c g}
- Zygomyia valida Winnertz, 1863^{c g}
- Zygomyia vara (Staeger, 1840)^{i c g}
- Zygomyia varipes Tonnoir & Edwards, 1927^{c g}
- Zygomyia zaitzevi Chandler, 1991^{c g}

Data sources: i=ITIS, c=Catalogue of Life, g=GBIF, b=Bugguide.net
