= Palaeodocosia =

Scientific classification
- Kingdom: Animalia
- Phylum: Arthropoda
- Class: Insecta
- Order: Diptera
- Family: Mycetophilidae
- Subfamily: Gnoristinae
- Genus: Palaeodocosia; Meunier, 1904

Synonyms
- Heteropygium Dziedzicki

Genus of flies

Palaeodocosia is a genus of flies belonging to the family Mycetophilidae.

The species of this genus are found in Europe and Northern America.

Species:

- Palaeodocosia alpicola (Strobl, 1895)
- Palaeodocosia brachypezoides (Meunier, 1904)
