= Dziedzickia =

Scientific classification
- Kingdom: Animalia
- Phylum: Arthropoda
- Class: Insecta
- Order: Diptera
- Family: Mycetophilidae
- Subfamily: Gnoristinae
- Genus: Dziedzickia; Johannsen, 1909

Genus of insects

Dziedzickia is a genus of flies belonging to the family Mycetophilidae.

The genus has almost cosmopolitan distribution.

Species:

- Dziedzickia absyrta Lane, 1954
- Dziedzickia armata Freeman, 1951
