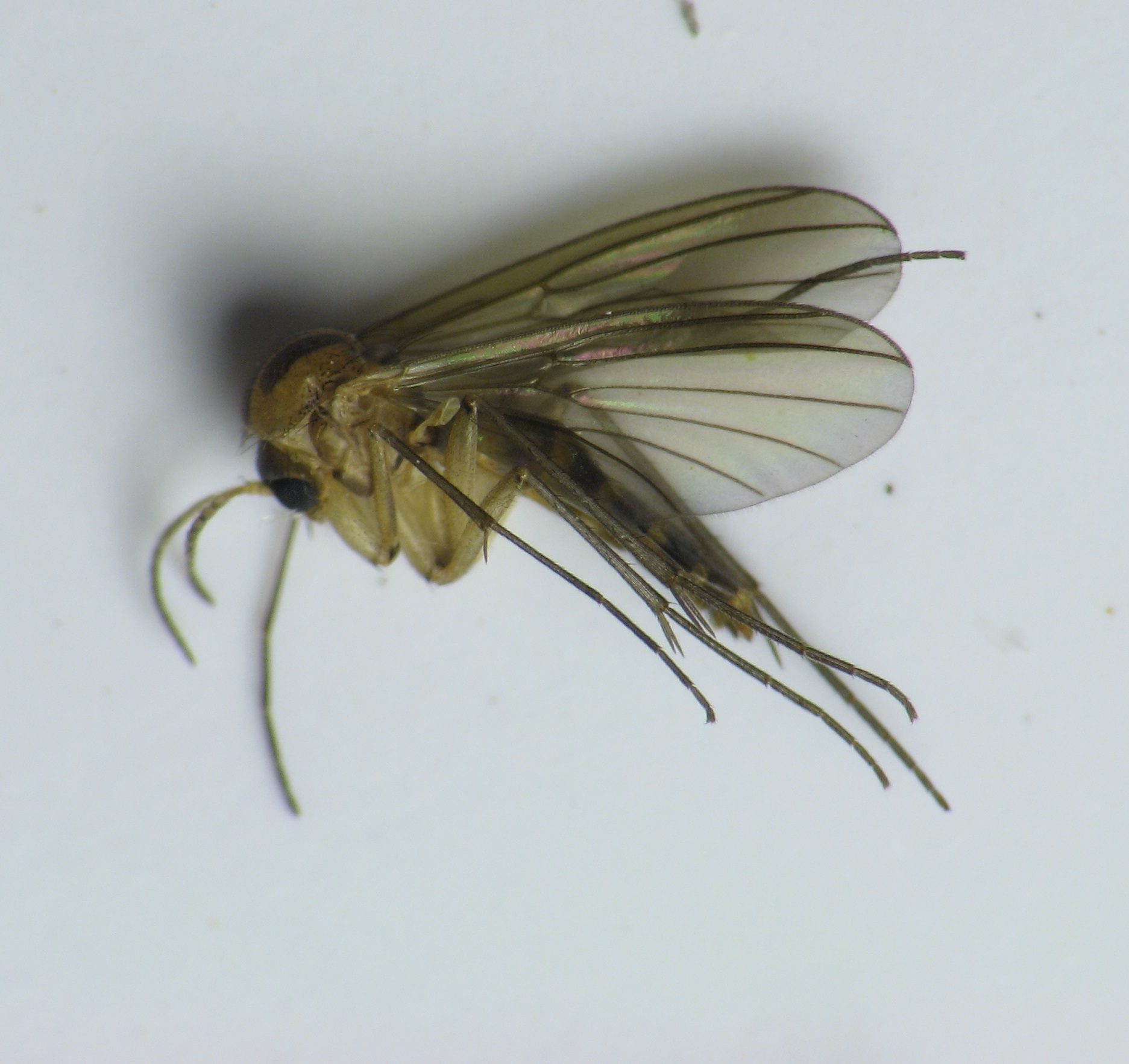
- Trichonta inside Jack in the pulpit flower

Scientific classification
- Domain: Eukaryota
- Kingdom: Animalia
- Phylum: Arthropoda
- Class: Insecta
- Order: Diptera
- Family: Mycetophilidae
- Genus: Trichonta; Winnertz, 1863

Species
- See text

= Trichonta =

Trichonta Temporal range: Eocene–recent

Genus of flies

Trichonta is a genus of flies belonging to the family Mycetophilidae.

The genus has almost cosmopolitan distribution.

Species:

- T. aberrans Lundstrom, 1911
- T. aberransida Hong, Wang & Xu, 2008
- †T. brachycamptoides Meunier, 1904 (Priabonian, Baltic Amber)
- †T. crassipes Meunier, 1904 (Priabonian, Baltic Amber)
- †T. dawsoni Scudder, 1877 (Eocene?, Quesnel)
