= Morganiella =

Scientific classification
- Domain: Eukaryota
- Kingdom: Animalia
- Phylum: Arthropoda
- Class: Insecta
- Order: Diptera
- Family: Mycetophilidae
- Genus: Morganiella; Tonnoir, 1927

Genus of insects

Morganiella is a genus of flies belonging to the family Mycetophilidae.

The species of this genus are found in New Zealand.

Species:

- Morganiella fusca Tonnoir & Edwards, 1927
