= Docosia =

Scientific classification
- Kingdom: Animalia
- Phylum: Arthropoda
- Class: Insecta
- Order: Diptera
- Family: Mycetophilidae
- Subfamily: Leiinae
- Tribe: Leiini
- Genus: Docosia; Winnertz

Genus of flies

Docosia is a genus of fungus gnats in the family Mycetophilidae.

== Selected species ==
- Docosia kerkini Kurina & Sevcik, 2011
- Docosia muranica Kurina & Sevcik, 2011
- Docosia rameli Kurina & Sevcik, 2011
