= Asindulum =

Scientific classification
- Kingdom: Animalia
- Phylum: Arthropoda
- Class: Insecta
- Order: Diptera
- Family: Keroplatidae
- Genus: Asindulum; Latreille, 1805

Synonyms
- Asyndulum Röder, 1887; Asyndulus Agassiz, 1846

Genus of flies

Asindulum is a genus of flies belonging to the family Keroplatidae.

The genus was first described by Latreille in 1805.

The species of this genus are found in Europe and Northern America.

Species:

- Asindulum nigrum Latreille, 1805
