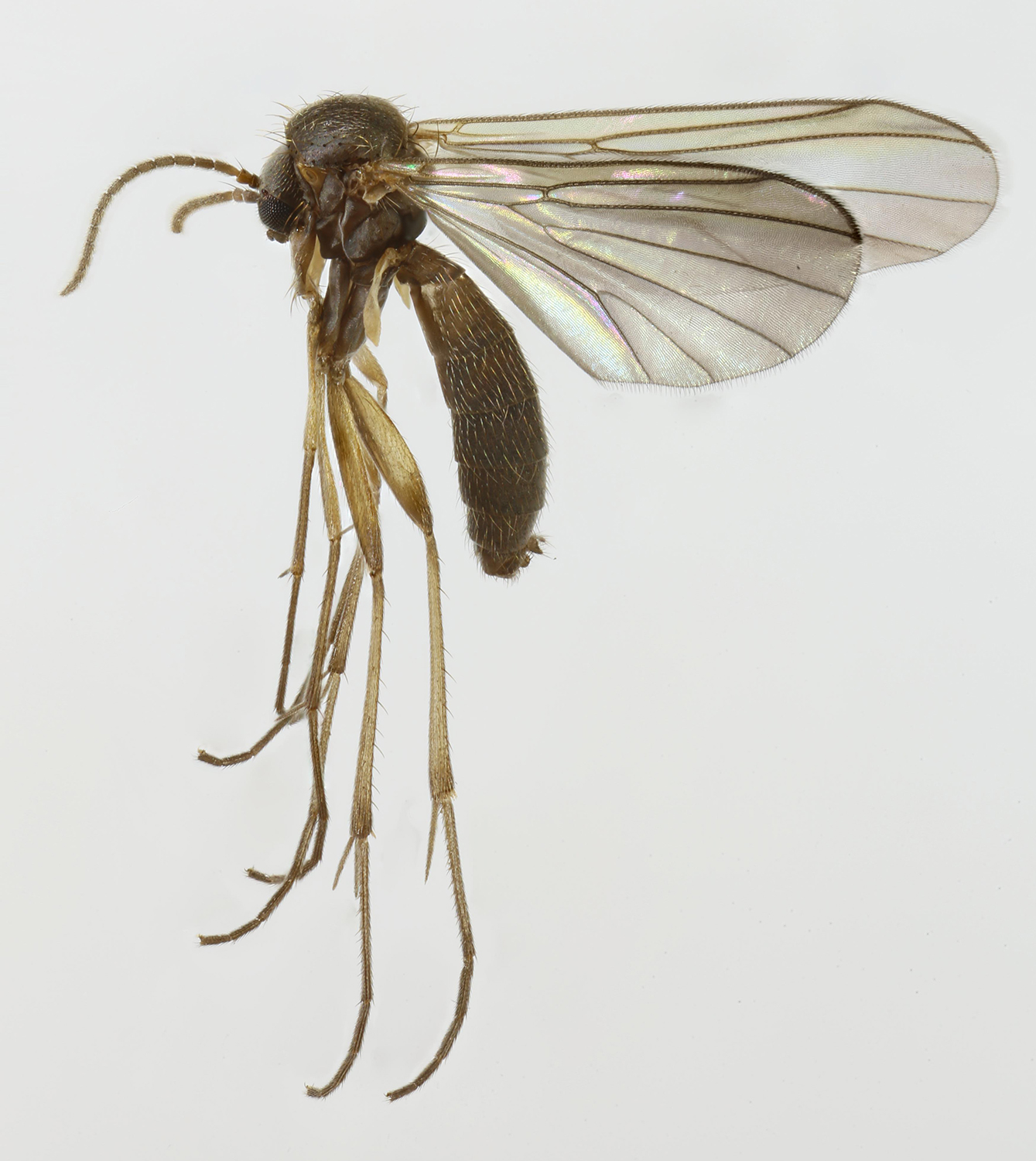

Scientific classification
- Kingdom: Animalia
- Phylum: Arthropoda
- Class: Insecta
- Order: Diptera
- Family: Mycetophilidae
- Genus: Phronia; Winnertz, 1863

= Phronia =

Genus of flies

Phronia is a genus of flies. It belongs to the family Mycetophilidae.

== List of species in Phronia ==
The following species are recognized in the genus:

- Phronia abbreviata
- Phronia abiesia
- Phronia abreui
- Phronia acra
- Phronia agilis
- Phronia anisoloba
- Phronia anjiana
- Phronia apicalis
- Phronia appropinquata
- Phronia arisaemae
- Phronia austriaca
- Phronia aviculata
- Phronia avida
- Phronia basalis
- Phronia biarcuata
- Phronia bicolor
- Phronia bicuspidalis
- Phronia boninensis
- Phronia borealis
- Phronia braueri
- Phronia brevifurcata
- Phronia caliginosa
- Phronia carli
- Phronia cinerascens
- Phronia conformis
- Phronia connex
- Phronia cordata
- Phronia coritanica
- Phronia crassitarsus
- Phronia cupida
- Phronia defensa
- Phronia denticulata
- Phronia despecta
- Phronia digitata
- Phronia diplocladia
- Phronia disgrega
- Phronia distincta
- Phronia diversiloba
- Phronia dryas
- Phronia duboides
- Phronia dziedzickii
- Phronia effusa
- Phronia egregia
- Phronia electa
- Phronia elegans
- Phronia elegantula
- Phronia emarginata
- Phronia exigua
- Phronia felicis
- Phronia flavicauda
- Phronia flavicollis
- Phronia flavipes
- Phronia flobertae
- Phronia forcipata
- Phronia forcipula
- Phronia fusciventris
- Phronia fusconitida
- Phronia gagnei
- Phronia gracilis
- Phronia gulata
- Phronia gusevae
- Phronia hilaris
- Phronia humeralis
- Phronia incerta
- Phronia indica
- Phronia insularis
- Phronia interstincta
- Phronia jacosa
- Phronia jigongensis
- Phronia jugata
- Phronia kolpaschica
- Phronia kurilensis
- Phronia laffooni
- Phronia lepida
- Phronia lochmocola
- Phronia longaelamellata
- Phronia longicosta
- Phronia longifurca
- Phronia longinervis
- Phronia lutescens
- Phronia maculata
- Phronia maderina
- Phronia maderopulchra
- Phronia matilei
- Phronia melica
- Phronia minuta
- Phronia montana
- Phronia mutabilis
- Phronia mutila
- Phronia myrtilli
- Phronia nebulosa
- Phronia nigricornis
- Phronia nigripalpis
- Phronia nitidiventris
- Phronia notata
- Phronia obscura
- Phronia obsoleta
- Phronia obtusa
- Phronia ochracea
- Phronia opaca
- Phronia oreas
- Phronia peculiaris
- Phronia persimilis
- Phronia petulans
- Phronia pigra
- Phronia pilosa
- Phronia portschinskyi
- Phronia rauschi
- Phronia riparia
- Phronia saxigena
- Phronia scalara
- Phronia siebeckii
- Phronia similis
- Phronia spinigera
- Phronia strenuiformis
- Phronia subforcipata
- Phronia subsilvatica
- Phronia sudetica
- Phronia sylvatica
- Phronia taczanowskyi
- Phronia tenebrosa
- Phronia tenuis
- Phronia terrea
- Phronia tiefii
- Phronia triangularis
- Phronia tricuspidata
- Phronia triloba
- Phronia tristis
- Phronia tyrrhenica
- Phronia undulata
- Phronia unica
- Phronia versuta
- Phronia vitrea
- Phronia willistoni
