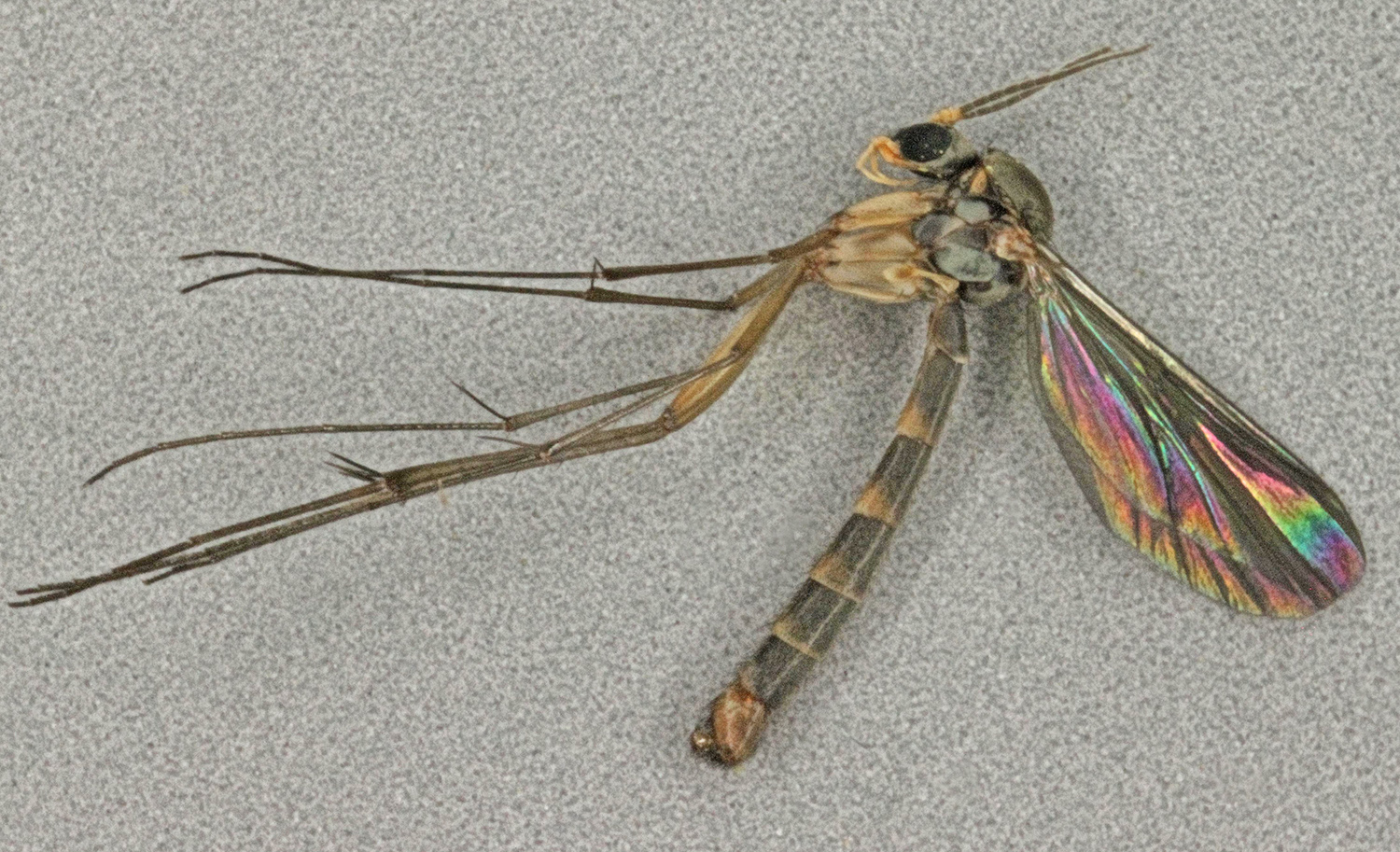
- Pseudexechia trisignata specimine

Scientific classification
- Domain: Eukaryota
- Kingdom: Animalia
- Phylum: Arthropoda
- Class: Insecta
- Order: Diptera
- Family: Mycetophilidae
- Tribe: Exechiini
- Genus: Pseudexechia; Tuomikoski, 1966

= Pseudexechia =

Genus of flies

Pseudexechia is a genus of flies belonging to the family Mycetophilidae.

The species of this genus are found in Europe, Japan and Northern America.

Species:

- Pseudexechia altaica Zaitzev, 1988
- Pseudexechia aurivernica Chandler, 1978
