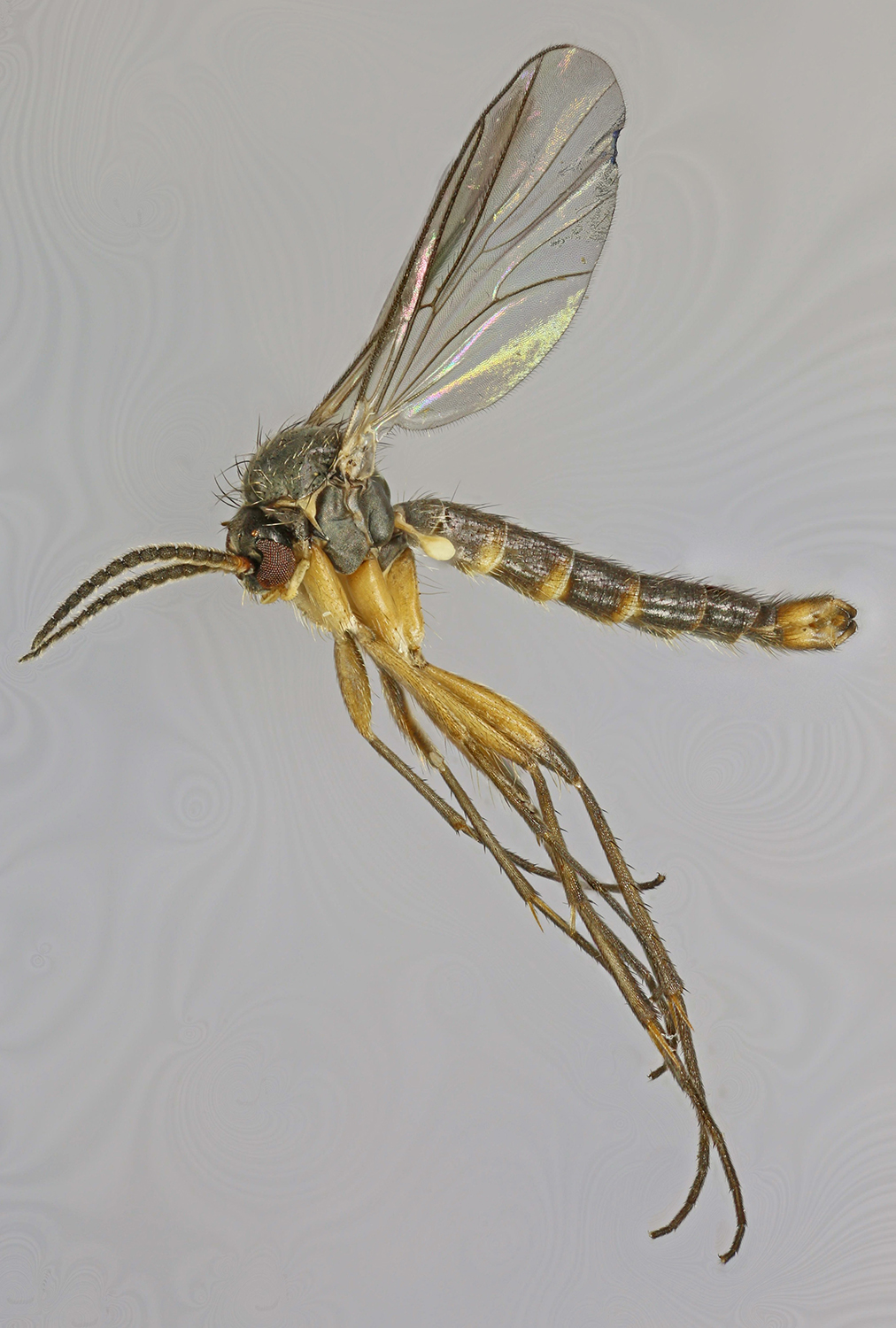
- Synapha vitripennis

Scientific classification
- Domain: Eukaryota
- Kingdom: Animalia
- Phylum: Arthropoda
- Class: Insecta
- Order: Diptera
- Family: Mycetophilidae
- Subfamily: Gnoristinae
- Genus: Synapha; Meigen, 1818

= Synapha =

Genus of flies

Synapha is a genus of flies belonging to the family Mycetophilidae.

Species:

- Synapha fasciata
- Synapha vitripennis
