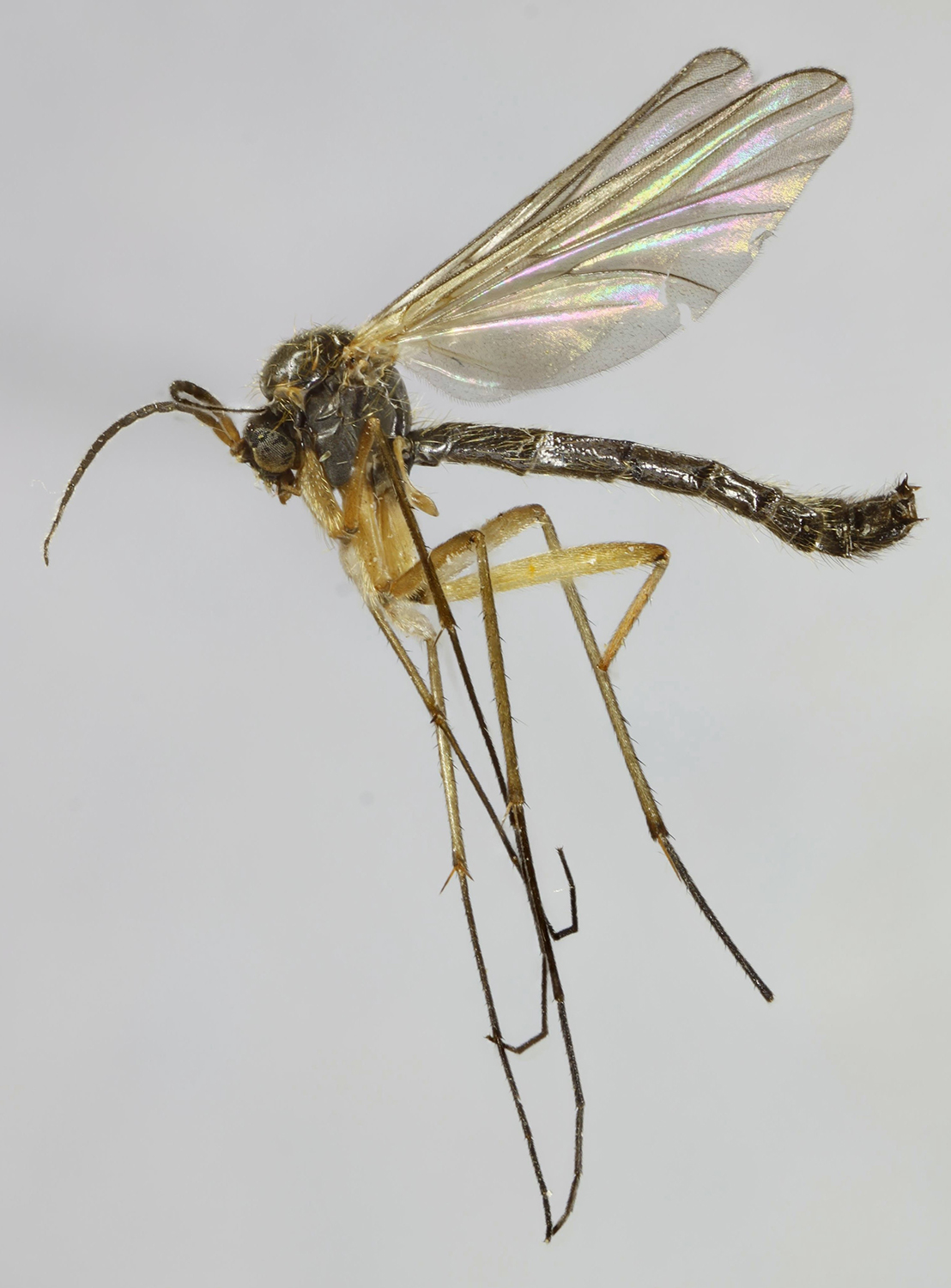
- Neuratelia nemoralis

Scientific classification
- Kingdom: Animalia
- Phylum: Arthropoda
- Class: Insecta
- Order: Diptera
- Family: Mycetophilidae
- Genus: Neuratelia; Rondani, 1856

= Neuratelia =

Genus of flies

Neuratelia is a genus of flies belonging to the family Mycetophilidae.

The species of this genus are found in Europe and Northern America.

Species:

- Neuratelia abrevena Garrett, 1925
- Neuratelia altoandina Henao-Sepúlveda, Wolff & Amorim, 2019
