= Novakia =

Scientific classification
- Domain: Eukaryota
- Kingdom: Animalia
- Phylum: Arthropoda
- Class: Insecta
- Order: Diptera
- Family: Mycetophilidae
- Genus: Novakia; Strobl, 1893

Genus of flies

Novakia is a genus of flies belonging to the family Mycetophilidae.

The species of this genus are found in Europe and Northern America.

Species:

- Novakia lisae Kerr, 2007
- Novakia miloi Kerr, 2007
