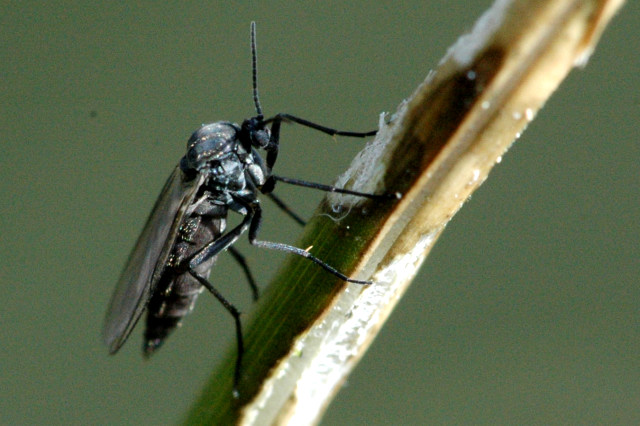
- Tetragoneura sylvatica

Scientific classification
- Domain: Eukaryota
- Kingdom: Animalia
- Phylum: Arthropoda
- Class: Insecta
- Order: Diptera
- Family: Mycetophilidae
- Subfamily: Gnoristinae
- Genus: Tetragoneura; Winnertz, 1846

= Tetragoneura =

Genus of flies

Tetragoneura is a genus of flies belonging to the family Mycetophilidae.

The species of this genus are found in Europe, Australia and America.

Species:

- Sciarella mycetophiliformis (Meunier, 1904)
- Sciophila tenera (Loew, 1850)
