= Macrorrhyncha =

Scientific classification
- Domain: Eukaryota
- Kingdom: Animalia
- Phylum: Arthropoda
- Class: Insecta
- Order: Diptera
- Family: Keroplatidae
- Genus: Macrorrhyncha; Winnertz, 1846

Genus of flies

Macrorrhyncha is a genus of flies belonging to the family Keroplatidae.

The species of this genus are found in Europe and Northern America.

Species:

- Macrorrhyncha ancae Matile, 1976
- Macrorrhyncha ardea Chandler, 1994
