= Ateleia (fly) =

Scientific classification
- Domain: Eukaryota
- Kingdom: Animalia
- Phylum: Arthropoda
- Class: Insecta
- Order: Diptera
- Family: Mycetophilidae
- Genus: Ateleia; Skuse, 1888

Genus of flies

Ateleia is a genus of flies belonging to the family Mycetophilidae.

The species of this genus are found in Australia.

Species:

- Ateleia spadicithorax Skuse, 1888
