= Eudicrana =

Scientific classification
- Kingdom: Animalia
- Phylum: Arthropoda
- Class: Insecta
- Order: Diptera
- Family: Mycetophilidae
- Subfamily: Eudicraninae
- Genus: Eudicrana; Loew, 1869

Genus of flies

Eudicrana is a genus of fungus gnats in the family Mycetophilidae. There are about 13 described species in Eudicrana.

== Species ==
These 13 species belong to the genus Eudicrana:

- Eudicrana affinis Okada, 1938
- Eudicrana araucariae Matile, 1991
- Eudicrana basinerva Freeman, 1951
- Eudicrana claripennis Edwards, 1931
- Eudicrana elegans Lane, 1948
- Eudicrana monticola (Tonnoir, 1929)
- Eudicrana nicholsoni (Tonnoir, 1929)
- Eudicrana nigriceps (Lundstrom, 1909)
- Eudicrana obumbrata Loew, 1869
- Eudicrana pallida Freeman, 1951
- Eudicrana similis Freeman, 1951
- Eudicrana splendens Lane, 1948
- Eudicrana vittata Edwards, 1931
