= Hadroneura =

Scientific classification
- Kingdom: Animalia
- Phylum: Arthropoda
- Clade: Pancrustacea
- Class: Insecta
- Order: Diptera
- Family: Mycetophilidae
- Subfamily: Gnoristinae
- Genus: Hadroneura; Lundström, 1906

Genus of flies

Hadroneura is a genus of flies belonging to the family Mycetophilidae.

The species of this genus are found in Europe and Northern America.

== Species ==
The following nine species belong to the genus as of 2026:

- Hadroneura huron Taber, 2018
- Hadroneura kamtshatica Stackelberg, 1943
- Hadroneura kincaidi (Coquillett, 1900)
- Hadroneura martini Ševčík et al., 2021
- Hadroneura occidentalis (Sherman, 1921)
- Hadroneura oregona (Cole, 1919)
- Hadroneura palmeni Lundstrom, 1906
- Hadroneura pullata (Coquillett, 1904)
- Hadroneura rutila (Sherman, 1921)
