= Impleta =

Scientific classification
- Kingdom: Animalia
- Phylum: Arthropoda
- Class: Insecta
- Order: Diptera
- Family: Mycetophilidae
- Genus: Impleta; Plassmann, 1978

Synonyms
- Acadia Vockeroth, 1980

Genus of flies

Impleta is a genus of flies belonging to the family Mycetophilidae.

The species of this genus are found in Europe and Northern America.

Species:

- Impleta consorta Plassmann, 1978
- Impleta polypori (Vockeroth, 1980)
