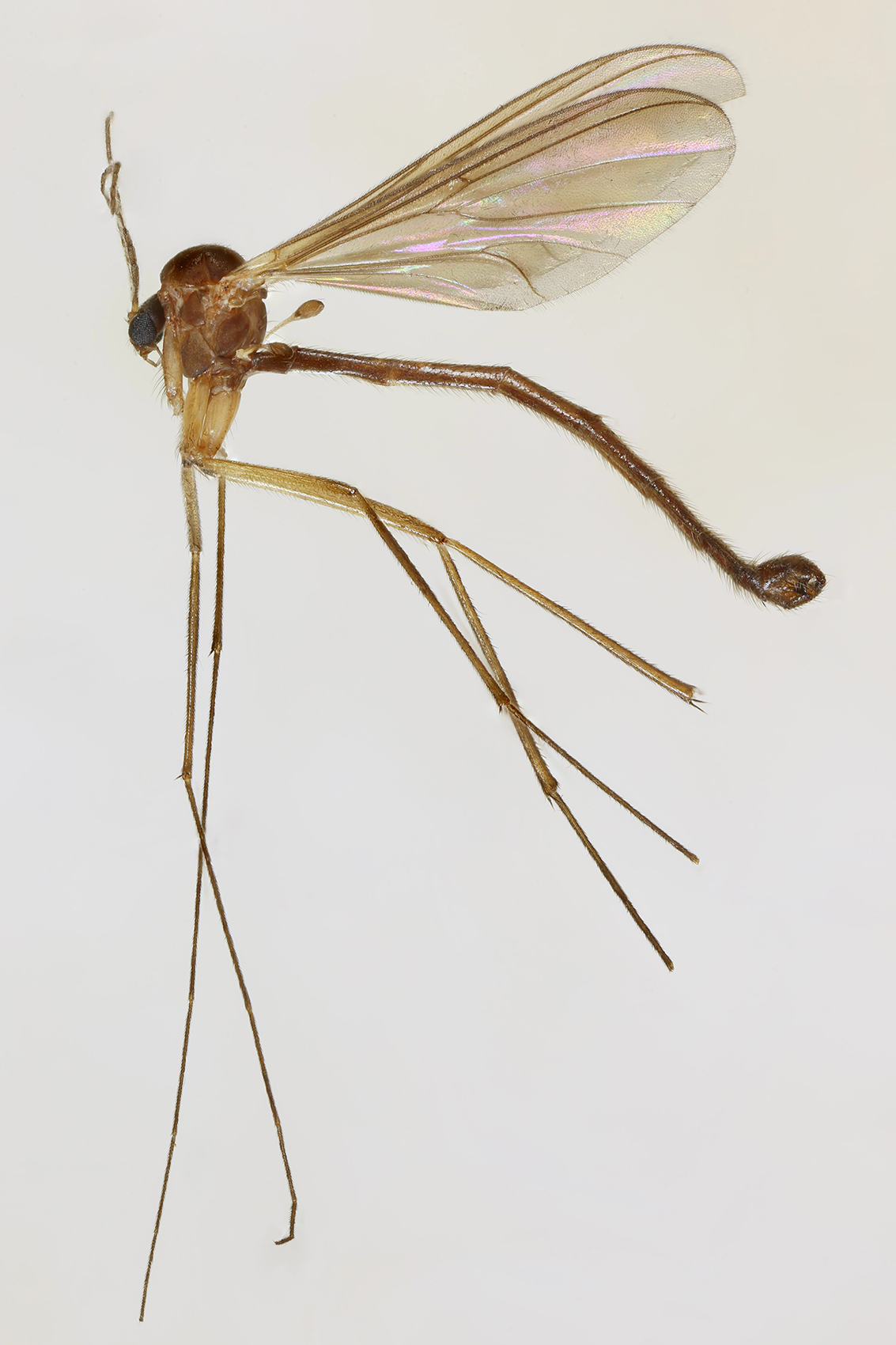
- Phthinia mira

Scientific classification
- Domain: Eukaryota
- Kingdom: Animalia
- Phylum: Arthropoda
- Class: Insecta
- Order: Diptera
- Family: Mycetophilidae
- Genus: Phthinia; Winnertz, 1863

= Phthinia =

Genus of flies

Phthinia is a genus of flies belonging to the family Mycetophilidae.

The genus has almost cosmopolitan distribution.

Species:

- Phthinia amorimi Fitzgerald
- Phthinia amurensis Zaitzev, 1994
