= Syntemna =

Scientific classification
- Domain: Eukaryota
- Kingdom: Animalia
- Phylum: Arthropoda
- Class: Insecta
- Order: Diptera
- Family: Mycetophilidae
- Subfamily: Gnoristinae
- Genus: Syntemna; Winnertz, 1863

Genus of flies

Syntemna is a genus of flies belonging to the family Mycetophilidae.

The species of this genus are found in Eurasia and Northern America.

Species:

- Loewiella asinduloides Meunier, 1904
- Loewiella brevitarsis Meunier, 1923
