= Saigusaia =

Scientific classification
- Domain: Eukaryota
- Kingdom: Animalia
- Phylum: Arthropoda
- Class: Insecta
- Order: Diptera
- Family: Mycetophilidae
- Subfamily: Gnoristinae
- Genus: Saigusaia; Vockeroth, 1980

Genus of flies

Saigusaia is a genus of flies belonging to the family Mycetophilidae.

The species of this genus are found in Europe and Northern America.

Species:

- Saigusaia aberrans Wu & Niu, 2008
- Saigusaia cincta (Johannsen, 1912)
