= Allocotocera =

Scientific classification
- Kingdom: Animalia
- Phylum: Arthropoda
- Class: Insecta
- Order: Diptera
- Family: Mycetophilidae
- Genus: Allocotocera; Mik 1886

Genus of flies

Allocotocera is a genus of flies in the family of Mycetophilidae. Two of the species are found in Europe.

== Species ==
- Allocotocera coxiponensis Lane, 1952
- Allocotocera flavicoxa Freeman, 1951
- Allocotocera nigricoxa Freeman, 1951
- Allocotocera pulchella (Curtis, 1837)
- Allocotocera scheria Chandler, 2006.
