= Polylepta =

Scientific classification
- Domain: Eukaryota
- Kingdom: Animalia
- Phylum: Arthropoda
- Class: Insecta
- Order: Diptera
- Family: Mycetophilidae
- Genus: Polylepta; Winnertz, 1863

Genus of flies

Polylepta is a genus of flies belonging to the family Mycetophilidae.

The species of this genus are found in Europe, Russia and Northern America.

Species:

- Polylepta borealis Lundstrom, 1912
- Polylepta dubiosa Brunetti, 1912
