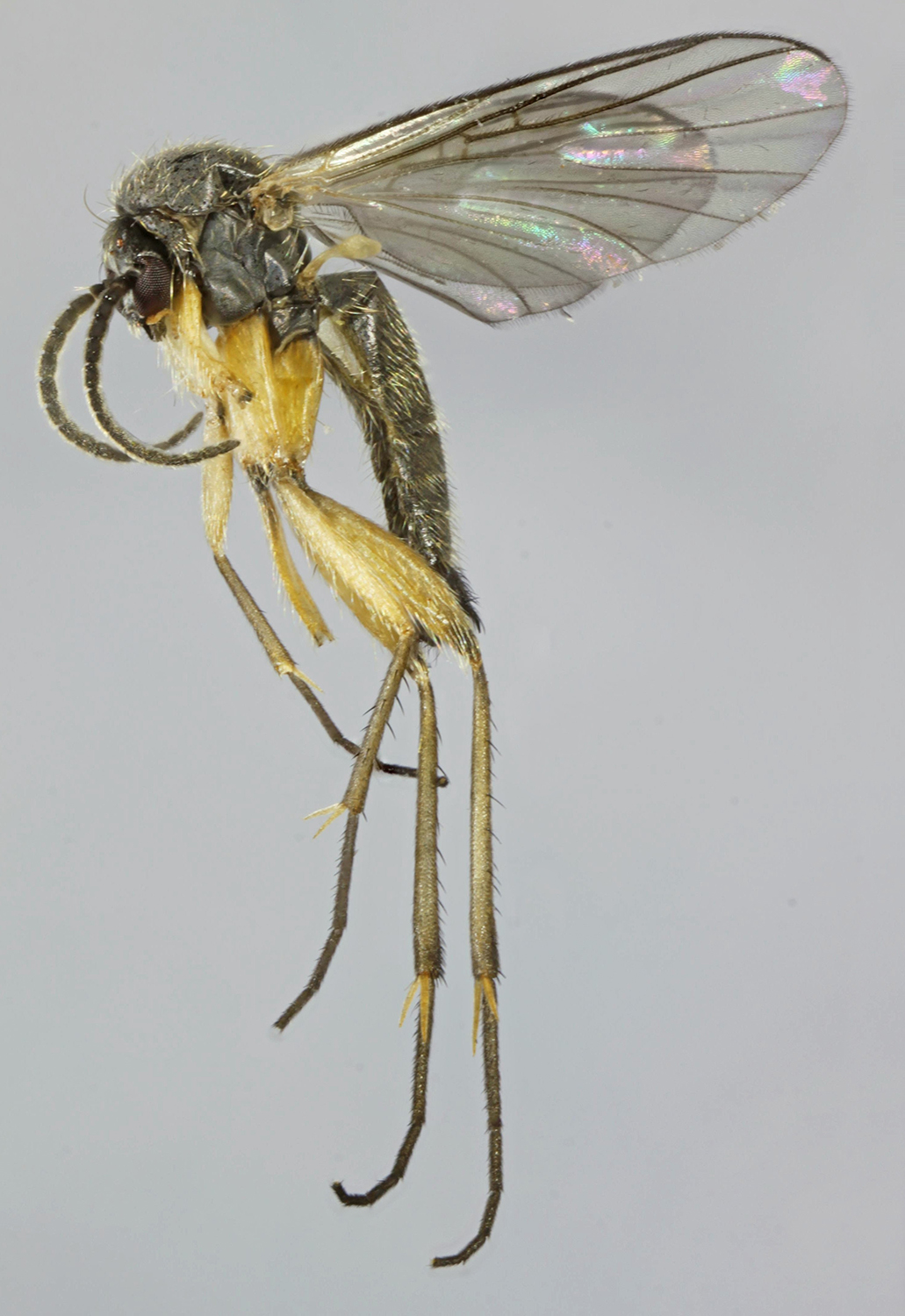
- Apolephthisa subincana

Scientific classification
- Domain: Eukaryota
- Kingdom: Animalia
- Phylum: Arthropoda
- Class: Insecta
- Order: Diptera
- Family: Mycetophilidae
- Subfamily: Gnoristinae
- Genus: Apolephthisa; Grzegorzek, 1885

= Apolephthisa =

Genus of flies

Apolephthisa is a genus of flies belonging to the family Mycetophilidae.

The species of this genus are found in Europe, Russia and Northern America.

Species:

- Apolephthisa bulunensis Blagoderov & Grimaldi, 2004
- Apolephthisa mesozoica Blagoderov, 1998
