= Anaclileia =

Scientific classification
- Kingdom: Animalia
- Phylum: Arthropoda
- Class: Insecta
- Order: Diptera
- Family: Mycetophilidae
- Genus: Anaclileia; Meunier, 1904

Genus of flies

Anaclileia is a genus of flies belonging to the family Mycetophilidae.

The species of this genus are found in Europe and Northern America.

== Species ==
- Anaclileia adjarica Kuirina, 2018
- †Anaclileia anacliniformis Meunier, 1904
- Anaclileia beshovskii Bechev, 1990
- Anaclileia dispar (Winnertz, 1863)
- †Anaclileia dissimilis Meunier, 1904
- Anaclileia dziedzickii (Landrock, 1911)
- †Anaclileia gazagnairei Meunier, 1904
- Anaclileia nepalensis Bechev, 1990
- Anaclileia splendida Zaitzev, 1994
- †Anaclileia sylvatica Meunier, 1904
- Anaclileia vallis Coher, 1995
- Anaclileia vockerothi Bechev, 1990
- Anaclileia winchesteri Coher, 1995
