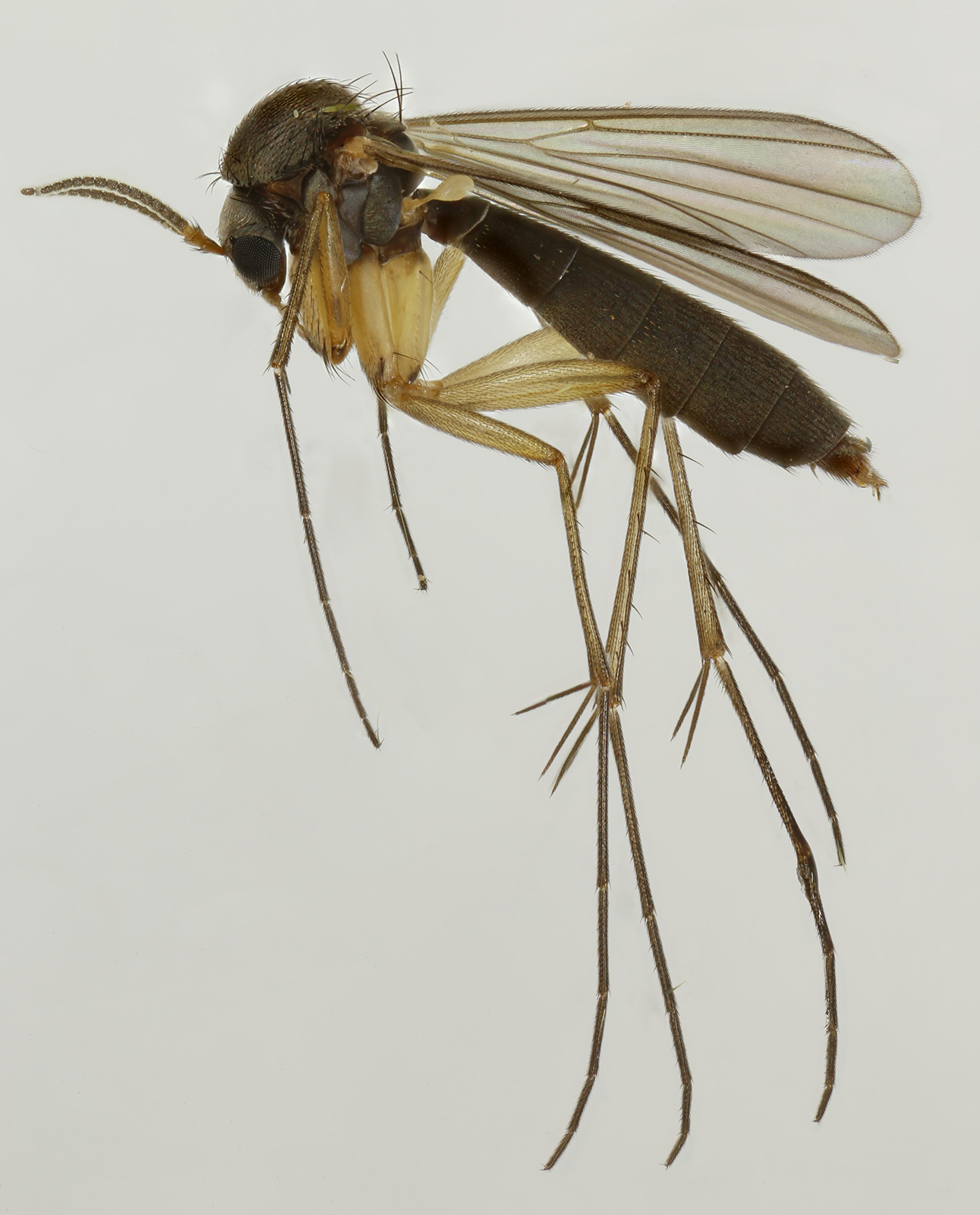
- Exechia spinuligera

Scientific classification
- Kingdom: Animalia
- Phylum: Arthropoda
- Clade: Pancrustacea
- Class: Insecta
- Order: Diptera
- Infraorder: Bibionomorpha
- Superfamily: Sciaroidea
- Family: Mycetophilidae; Newman, 1834

Subfamilies
- Gnoristinae; Leiinae; Manotinae; Mycetophilinae; Mycomyinae; Sciophilinae

Diversity
- ca. 150 genera

= Mycetophilidae =

Family of flies

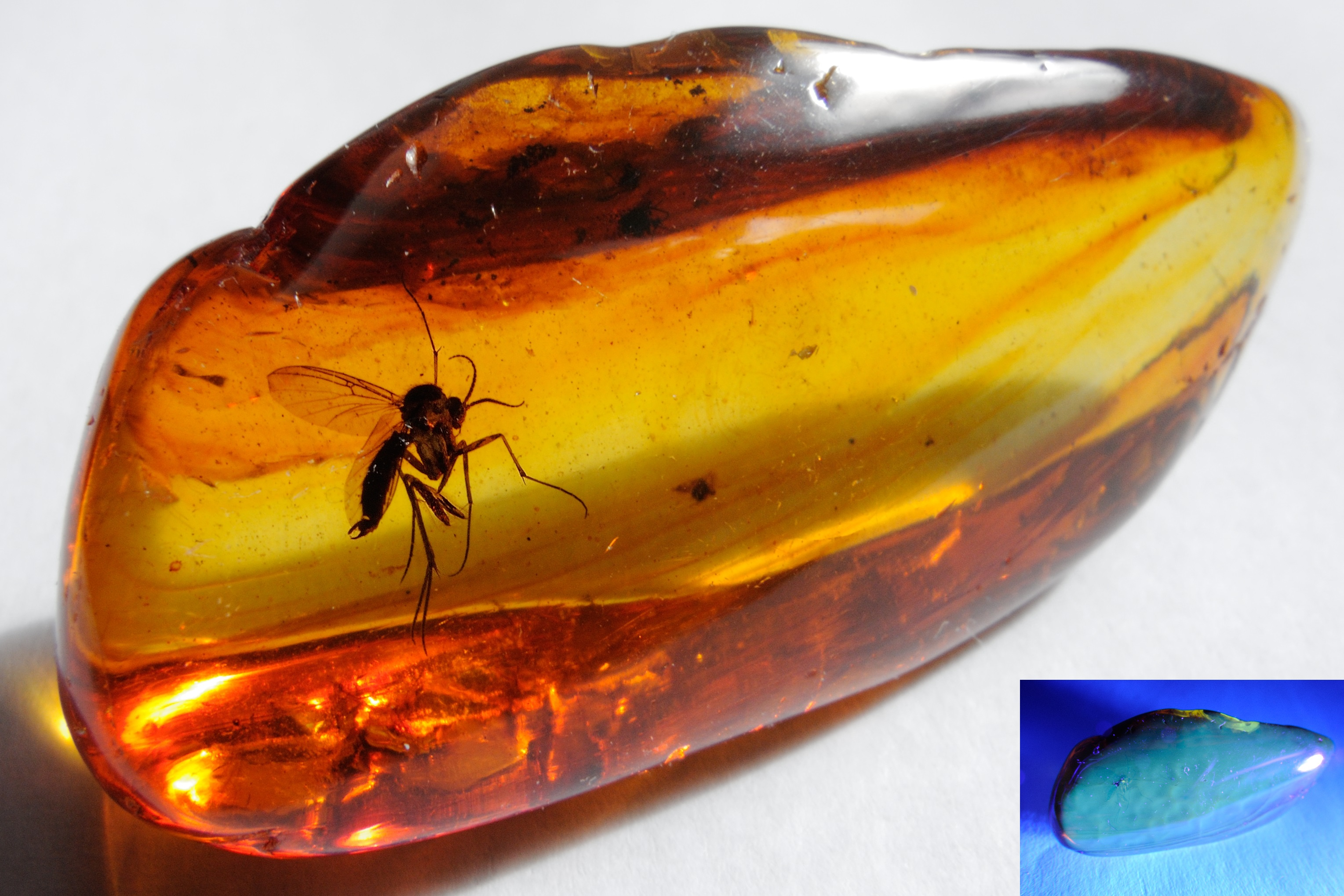
Fossil in Baltic amber

Mycetophilidae is a family of small flies, forming the bulk of those species known as fungus gnats. About 3000 described species are placed in 150 genera, but the true number of species is undoubtedly much higher. They are generally found in the damp habitats favoured by their host fungi and sometimes form dense swarms.

Adults of this family can usually be separated from other small flies by the strongly humped thorax, well-developed coxae, and often spinose legs, but identification within the family between genera and species generally requires close study of microscopic features such as subtle differences in wing venation and variation in chaetotaxy and genitalia. The terrestrial larvae usually feed on fungi, especially the fruiting bodies, but also spores and hyphae, but some species have been recorded on mosses and liverworts. The larvae of some species, while still being associated with fungi, are at least partly predatory. Some species are attracted to the fungal odor let off by plants like Jack-in-the-Pulpit, and end up pollinating them in their search for food.

== Description ==
Adult Mycetophilidae sometimes gather in great numbers in various hiding places, under tree roots and holes, and in general they are the most common insects in our forests. However, due to their small size and inconspicuous coloration, they are rarely known or noticed. On the other hand, the larvae of mushroom eaters are known to all, since they form the main population of mushrooms with worms. In addition to the fruiting bodies of cap mushrooms, they also inhabit wood fungi and can be found under the bark of decaying trees. The diet of most larvae is exclusively fungal, but some members of this family are predators. Adults do not cause damage to plants, but lay 2 small eggs on the surface of moist soil (5–8 cm). Larvae, translucent, legless worms with a black "head" measuring 8–10 mm, later emerge from the eggs. The mouthparts are gnawing. The larvae usually develop in soil on decaying plant tissue. However, under indoor conditions they often lack feeding substratum, so they gnaw at tender young roots and underground shoots of plants. This is the main hazard. The occurrence of large numbers of fungal mosquitoes in the garden will lead to an exponential increase in larval numbers, which in turn will result in root damage that leads to yellowing of leaves, loss of energy to the plant and often a significant reduction in garden productivity.

The larvae can also be carriers of diseases that infect plants, in some cases resulting in a total loss of crops. Although fungus mosquitoes are generally more of an annoyance than a threat, their presence should be taken seriously and measures to control and eliminate this pest should be started as soon as possible after detection.

== Bioluminescence ==
Around a dozen mycetophilid species are unique among flies in displaying bioluminescence. In some species, this is restricted to the larval stage, but in others this feature is retained by the pupae and adults. The ability to produce their own light may be used by some predatory larvae as a lure for potential prey, although it also obviously makes them more susceptible to predation or parasitism. These are not mycetophilids sensu stricto, but belong to the family Keroplatidae.

== Fossil record ==
Mycetophilids, including some extant genera, are well represented in amber deposits and the group appears to have been well established and diversified by the Cretaceous period at the latest.

== Taxonomy ==
Some 800 species (including some of the bioluminescent species) were split into a separate family by Tuomikoski (1966), Keroplatidae. This split is not universally recognized as yet, and many sources still include the keroplatid genera within the Mycetophilidae. Other recent families, included here in Mycetophilidae as they are not recognized by all workers, are Ditomyiidae, Lygistorrhinidae, Diadocidiidae, and Rangomaramidae. The Mycetophilidae sensu lato contain about 330 described genera. These include:

- Acnemia Meigen, 1818
- Acomopterella Zaitzev, 1989
- Acrodicrania Skuse, 1888
- Adicroneura Vockeroth, 1980
- Afrocnemia Matile, 1998
- Agaromya Rondani, 1861
- Aglaomyia Vockeroth, 1980
- Alavamanota Blagoderov & Arillo, 2002
- Allactoneura Meijere, 1907
- Allocotocera Mik, 1886
- Allodia Winnertz, 1863
- Allodiopsis Tuomikoski, 1966
- Anaclileia Meunier, 1904
- Anatella Winnertz, 1863
- Aneura Marshall, 1896
- Anomalomyia Hutton, 1904
- Aphrastomyia Coher & Lane, 1949
- Apolephthisa Grzegorzek, 1885
- Archaeboletina Meunier, 1904
- Armbrusteleia Evenhuis, 1994
- Aspidionia Colless, 1966
- Atalosciophila Ren, 1995
- Ateleia Skuse, 1888
- Austrosciophila Tonnoir, 1929
- Austrosynapha Tonnoir, 1929
- Aysenmyia Duret, 1979
- Azana Walker, 1856
- Baeopterogyna Vockeroth, 1972
- Baisodicrana Blagoderov, 1995
- Boletina Stæger, 1840
- Boletiniella Matile, 1973
- Bolithomya Rondani, 1856
- Boraceomyia Lane, 1948
- Brachydicrania Skuse, 1888
- Brachypeza Winnertz, 1863
- Brachyradia Ševcík & Kjaerandsen, 2012
- Brevicornu Marshall, 1896
- Caledonileia Matile, 1993
- Callicypta Lane, 1954
- Cawthronia Tonnoir & Edwards, 1927
- Celebesomyia Saigusa, 1973
- Chalastonepsia Søli, 1996
- Clastobasis Skuse, 1890
- Cluzobra Edwards, 1940
- Coelophthinia Edwards, 1941
- Coelosia Winnertz, 1863
- Cordyla Meigen, 1803
- Cowanomyia Jaschhof & Jaschhof, 2009
- Creagdhubhia Chandler, 1999
- Cycloneura Marshall, 1896
- Deimyia Kallweit, 2002:
- Dianepsia Loew, 1850
- Dinempheria Matile, 1979
- Disparoleia Blagoderov & Grimaldi, 2004
- Docosia Winnertz, 1863
- Dongbeimyceta Hong, 2002
- Drepanorzeckia Blagoderov, 1997
- Duretophragma Borkent, 2013
- Dynatosoma Winnertz, 1863
- Echinopodium Freeman, 1951
- Ectrepesthoneura Enderlein, 1910
- Ekhiritus Blagoderov, 1995
- Eoexechia Camier & Nel, 2020
- Eomyceta Hong, 2002
- Eosciophila Hong, 1974
- Epicypta Winnertz, 1863
- Eudicrana Loew, 187
- Eumanota Edwards, 1933
- Exechia Winnertz, 1863
- Exechiites Blagoderov, 2000
- Exechiopsis Tuomikoski, 1966
- Fushunoboleta Hong, 2002
- Gaalomyia Blagoderov & Grimaldi, 2004
- Garrettella Vockeroth, 1980
- Gnoriste Meigen, 1818
- Gracilileia Matile, 1993
- Greenomyia Brunetti, 1912
- Gregikia Blagoderov & Grimaldi, 2004
- Grzegorzekia Edwards, 1941
- Hadroneura Lundström, 1906
- Hemisphaeronotus Saigusa, 2007
- Hemolia Blagoderov & Grimaldi, 2004
- Impleta Plassmann, 1978
- Indoleia Edwards, 1928
- Ipsaneusidalys Blagoderov, 1998
- Izleiina Blagoderov & Grimaldi, 2004
- Jugazana Coher, 1995
- Katatopygia Martinsson & Kjaerandsen, 2012
- Lecadonileia Blagoderov & Grimaldi, 2004
- Leia Meigen, 1818
- Leiella Enderlein, 1910
- Leptomorphus Curtis, 1831
- Loewiella Meunier, 1894
- Lusitanoneura Ribeiro & Chandler, 2007
- Macrobrachius
- Macrocera
- Macrorrhyncha
- Manota
- Megalopelma
- Megophthalmidia
- Micromacrocera
- Monoclona
- Morganiella
- Mycetophila
- Mycomya
- Myrosia
- Neoallocotocera
- Neoaphelomera
- Neoclastobasis
- Neoempheria
- Neotrizygia
- Neuratelia
- Notolopha
- Novakia
- Orfelia
- Palaeodocosia
- Paleoplatyura
- Paracycloneura
- Paraleia
- Paramorganiella
- Paratinia
- Paratrizygia
- Parvicellula
- Phoenikiella
- Phronia
- Phthinia
- Platurocypta
- Platyura
- Polylepta
- Pseudalysiina
- Pseudexechia
- Pseudobrachypeza
- Pseudorymosia
- Rondaniella
- Rymosia
- Saigusaia
- Sceptonia
- Sciophila
- Sigmoleia
- Speolepta
- Stenophragma
- Sticholeia
- Stigmatomeria
- Symmerus
- Synapha
- Synplasta
- Syntemna
- Tarnania
- Tasmanina
- Taxicnemis
- Tetragoneura
- Trichonta
- Trichoterga
- Trizygia
- Xenoplatyura
- Zygomyia
- Zygophronia

== Gallery ==
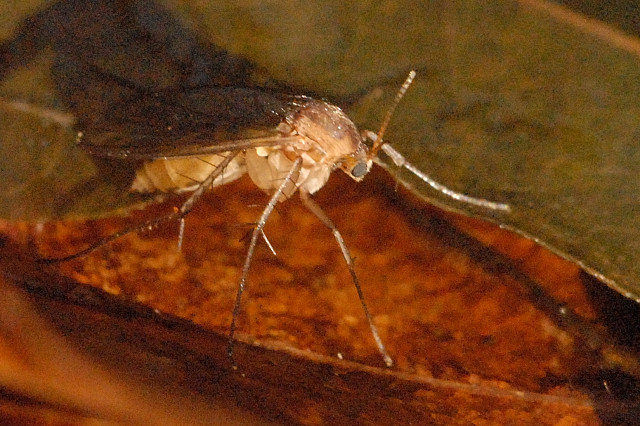
Mycetophila fungorum (De Geer, 1776)

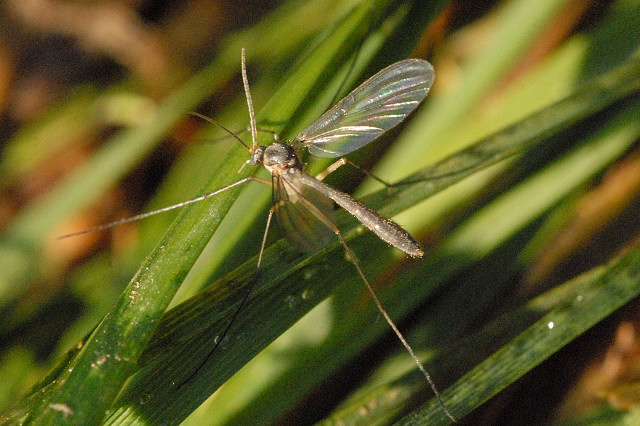
Neoempheria pictipennis (Haliday, 1833)

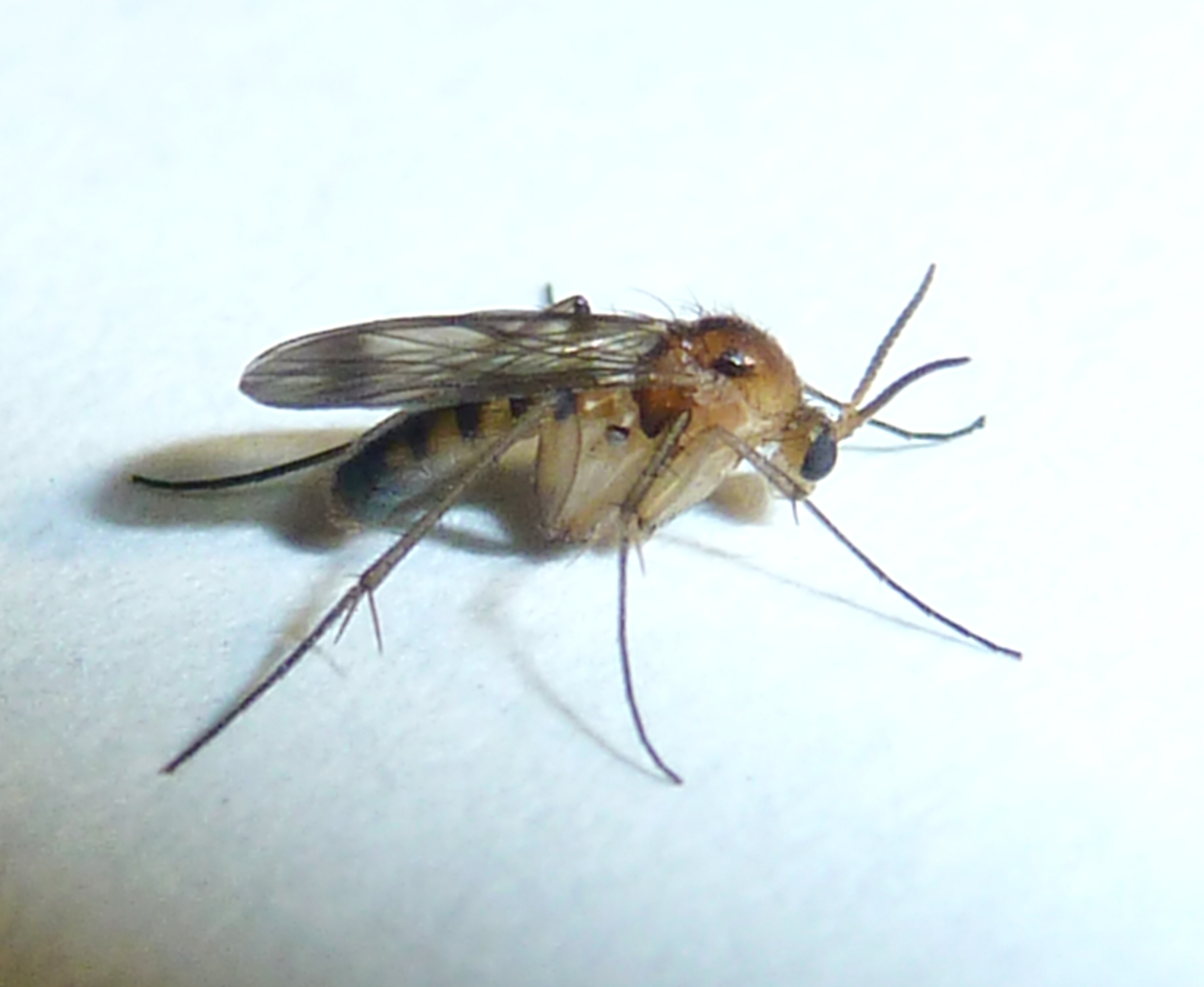
Mycetophila sp.

Leia sp., male

Sceptonia sp.

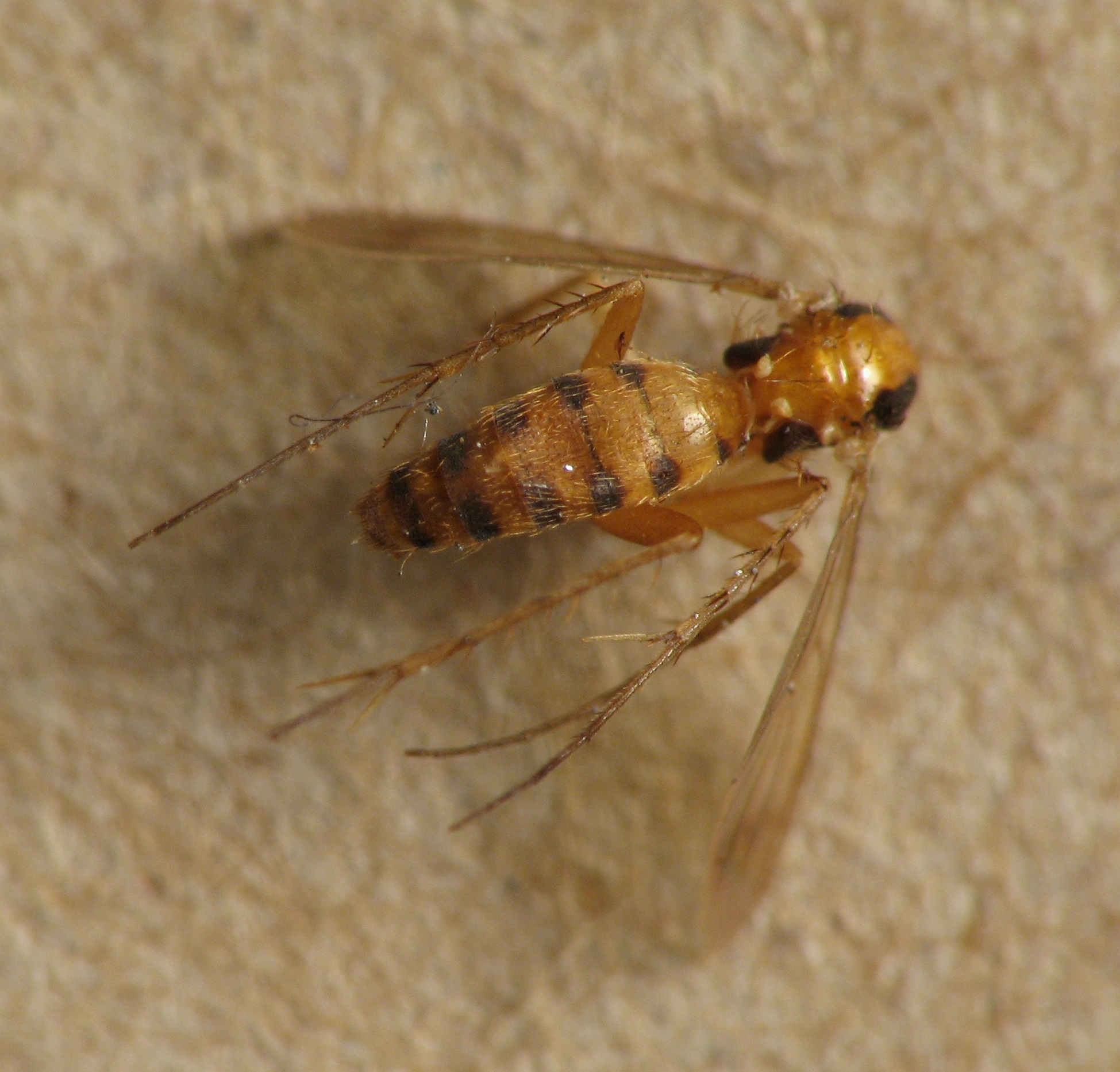
Leia bivittata

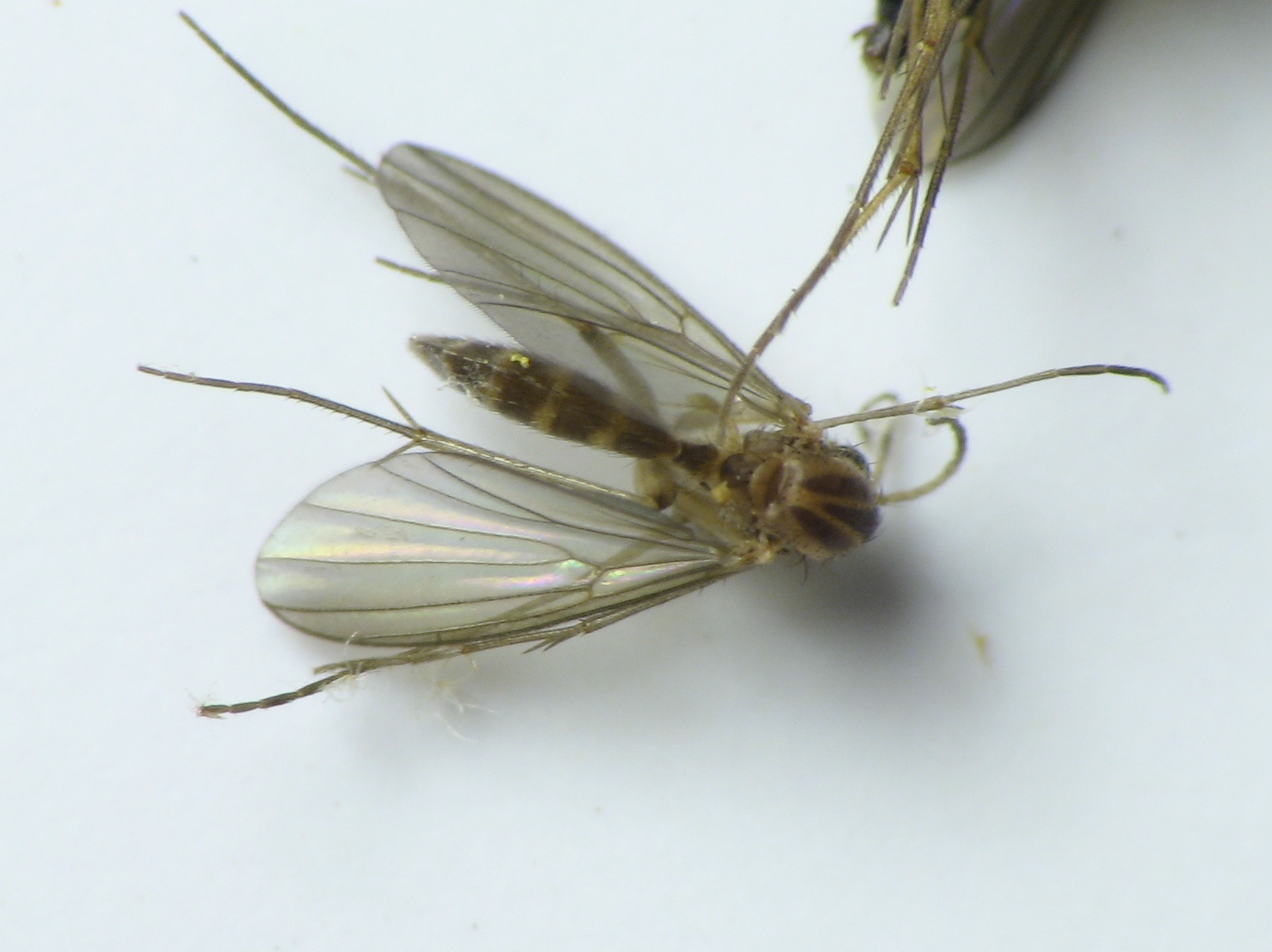
Trichonta sp.

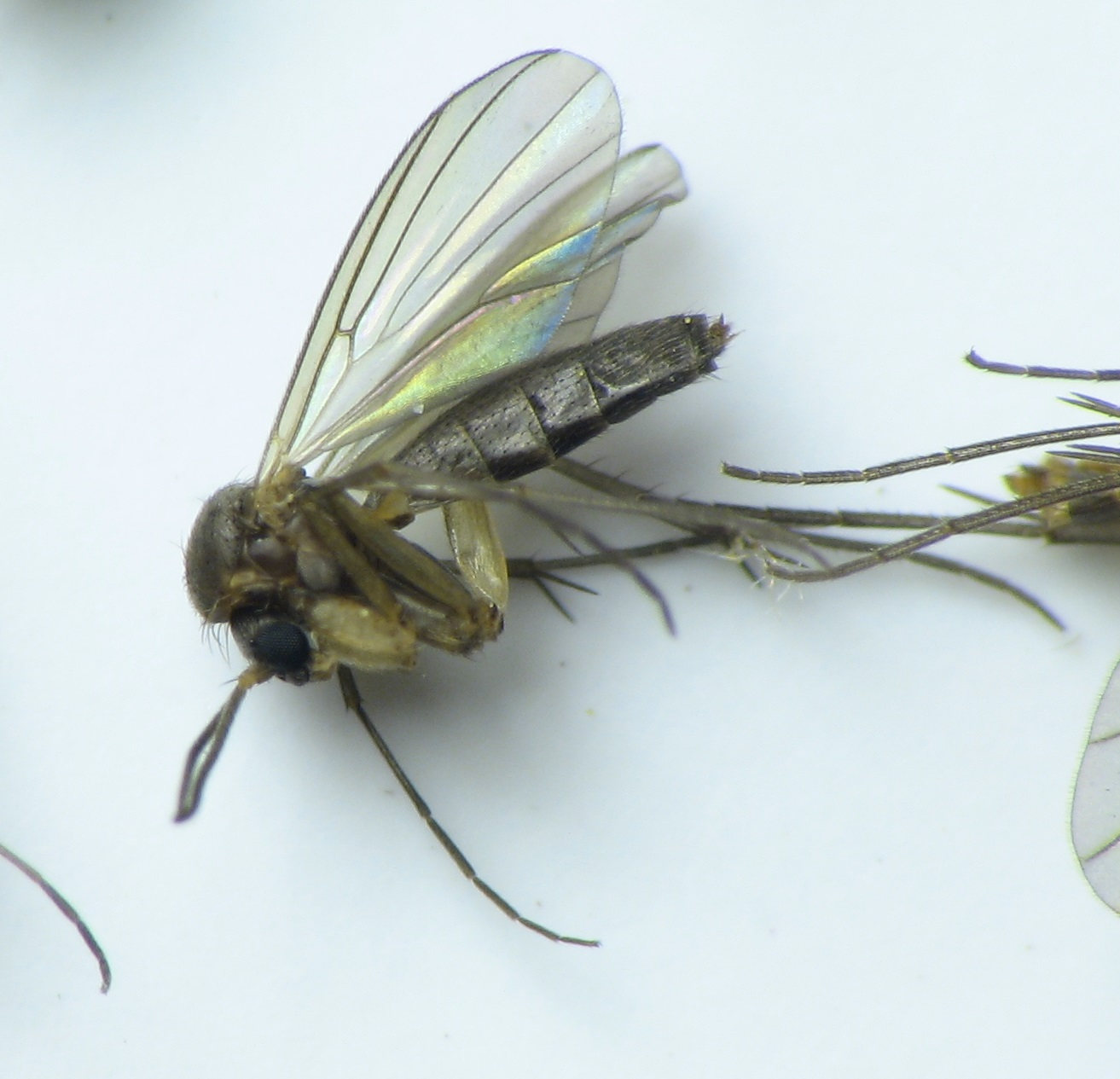
Phronia sp., female

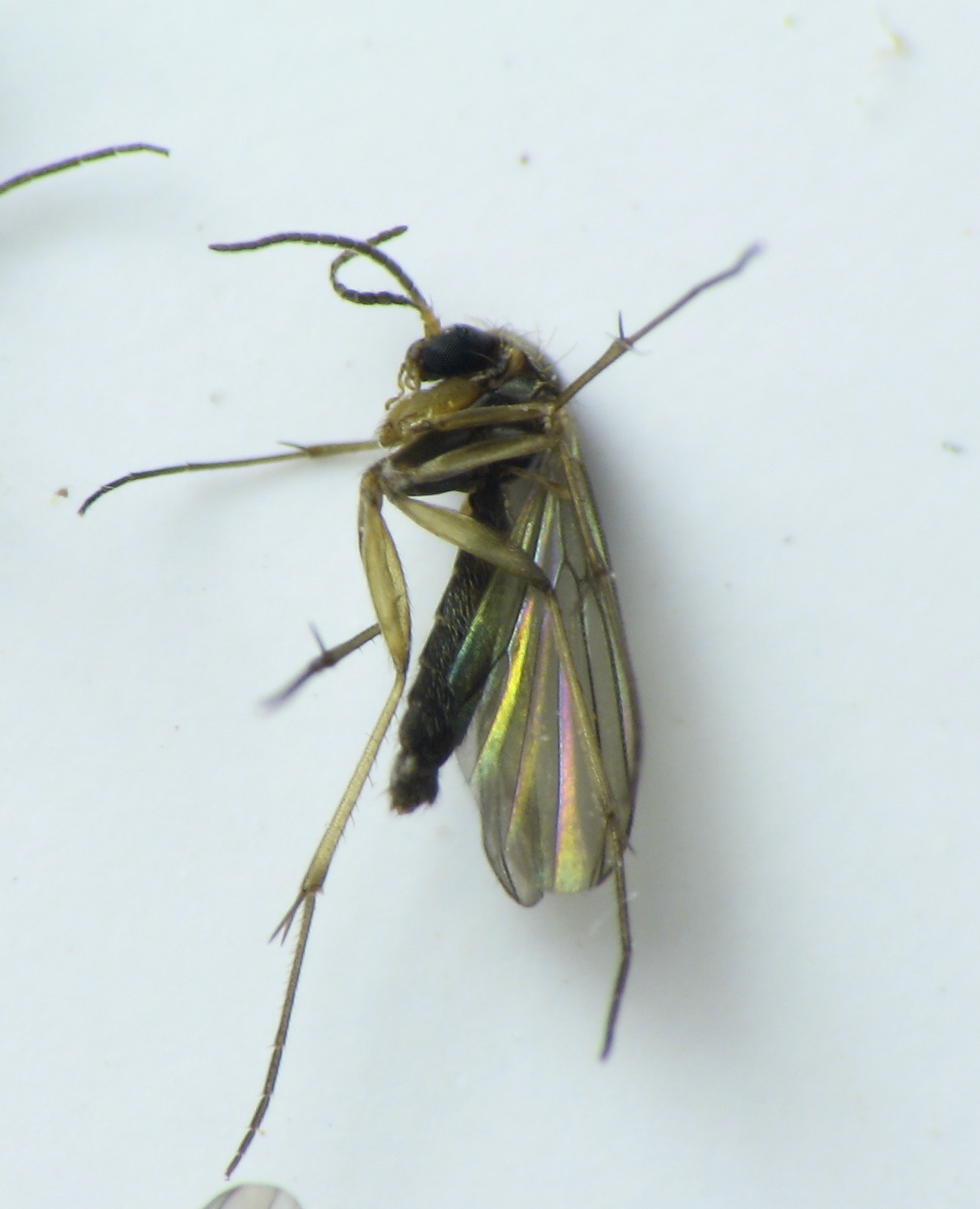
Phronia male inside Jack in the pulpit flower

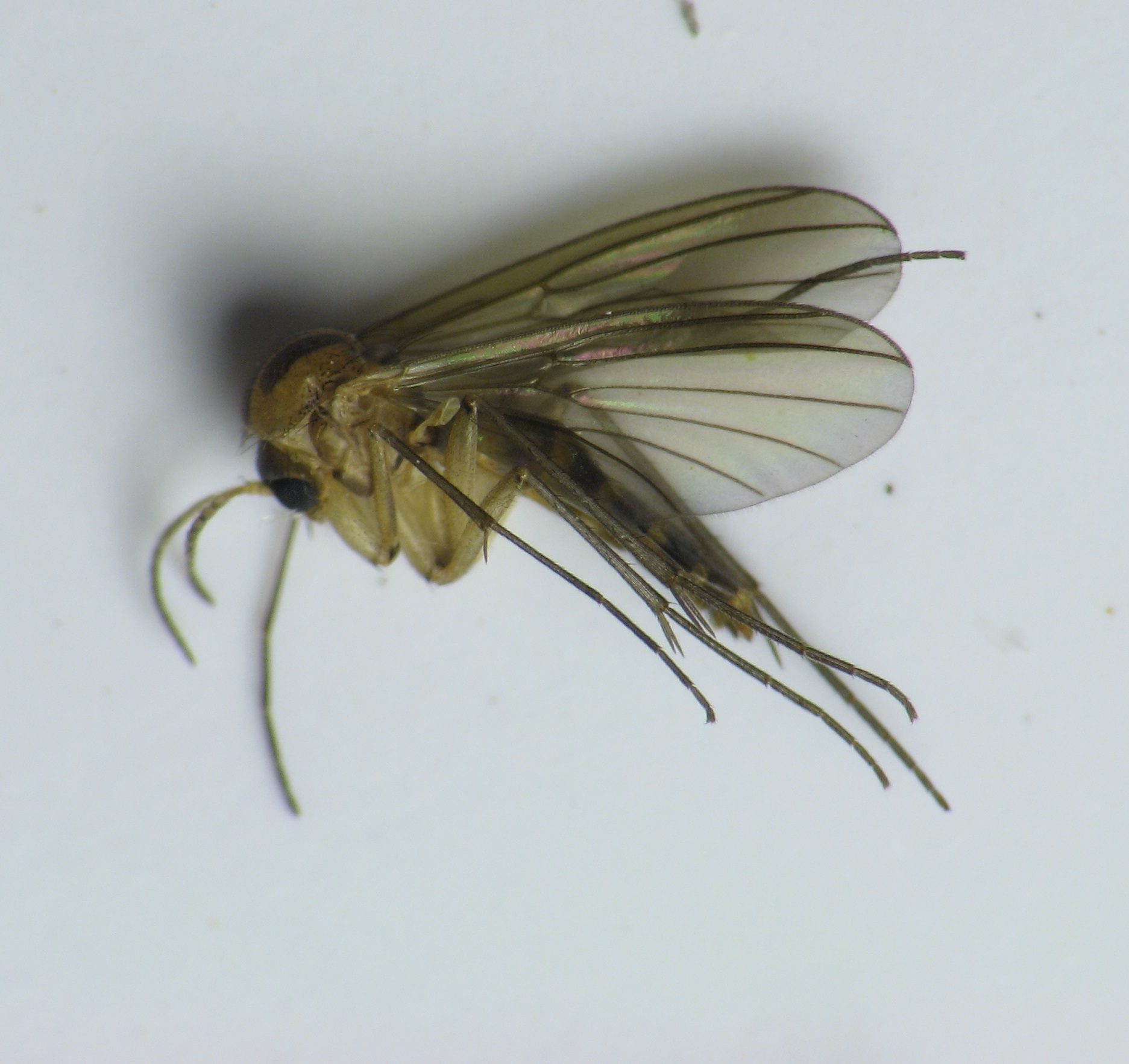
Trichonta inside Jack in the pulpit flower

== Catalogues ==
- Evenhuis, N. L. (2006). Catalog of the Keroplatidae of the World (Insecta:Diptera) (PDF). Bishop Museum Press. ISBN 978-1-58178-054-3.
