= Greenomyia =

Scientific classification
- Domain: Eukaryota
- Kingdom: Animalia
- Phylum: Arthropoda
- Class: Insecta
- Order: Diptera
- Family: Mycetophilidae
- Genus: Greenomyia; Brunetti, 1912

Genus of flies

Greenomyia is a genus of flies belonging to the family Mycetophilidae.

The species of this genus are found in Europe and Northern America.

Species:

- Greenomyia baikalica Zaitzev, 1994
- Greenomyia borealis (Winnertz, 1863)
