= List of Mycetophila species =

This is a list of 742 species in Mycetophila, a genus of fungus gnats in the family Mycetophilidae.

== Mycetophila species ==
- Mycetophila abbreviata Landrock, 1914^{c g}
- Mycetophila abdominale (Staeger, 1840)^{c g}
- Mycetophila abiecta (Lastovka, 1963)^{c g}
- Mycetophila absqua Wu, He & Yang, 1998^{c g}
- Mycetophila acarensis Lane, 1952^{c g}
- Mycetophila acarisi Lane, 1958^{c g}
- Mycetophila adumbrata Mik, 1884^{c g}
- Mycetophila aequalis Walker, 1856^{c g}
- Mycetophila aequilonga Wu, He & Yang, 1998^{c g}
- Mycetophila aguilaensis Duret, 1983^{c g}
- Mycetophila alacalufesi Duret, 1980^{c g}
- Mycetophila alata Guthrie, 1917^{i c g}
- Mycetophila alberta Curran, 1927^{i c g}
- Mycetophila alea Laffoon, 1965^{i c g}
- Mycetophila alexanderi (Laffoon, 1957)^{i c g}
- Mycetophila aliciae Duret, 1981^{c g}
- Mycetophila altensis Duret, 1980^{c g}
- Mycetophila amoena (Winnertz, 1863)^{c g}
- Mycetophila amplicercis Duret, 1989^{c g}
- Mycetophila amplipennis Freeman, 1951^{c g}
- Mycetophila amplocercis Duret, 1991^{c g}
- Mycetophila analis (Coquillett, 1901)^{i c g}
- Mycetophila ancyloformans (Holmgren, 1907)^{c g}
- Mycetophila andina Duret, 1983^{c g}
- Mycetophila andinensis Duret, 1991^{c g}
- Mycetophila angularisa Wu, 1997^{c g}
- Mycetophila angustifurca Enderlein, 1938^{c g}
- Mycetophila anhangaensis Lane, 1961^{c g}
- Mycetophila anivensis Zaitzev, 1999^{c g}
- Mycetophila annulara Wu, He & Yang, 1998^{c g}
- Mycetophila apicalis Freeman, 1951^{c g}
- Mycetophila apicata Philippi, 1865^{c g}
- Mycetophila aracanensis Duret, 1985^{c g}
- Mycetophila arancanensis Duret, 1985^{c g}
- Mycetophila arauasi Lane, 1958^{c g}
- Mycetophila araucana Lane, 1962^{c g}
- Mycetophila arcuata Meigen, 1818^{c g}
- Mycetophila arecunai Lane, 1955^{c g}
- Mycetophila argentina Lane, 1958^{c g}
- Mycetophila argentinensis Duret, 1986^{c g}
- Mycetophila armatura Freeman, 1951^{c g}
- Mycetophila arnaudi (Lafoon, 1957)^{i c g}
- Mycetophila arribalzagai Duret, 1981^{c g}
- Mycetophila artigasi Duret, 1980^{c g}
- Mycetophila artyomi Zaitzev, 1998^{c g}
- Mycetophila asiatica (Okada, 1939)^{c g}
- Mycetophila assimilis Matile, 1967^{c g}
- Mycetophila atlantica Nielsen, 1966^{g}
- Mycetophila atra (Macquart, 1834)^{c g}
- Mycetophila atricornis Philippi, 1865^{c g}
- Mycetophila attenuata Wiedemann, 1818^{c g}
- Mycetophila attonsa (Laffoon, 1957)^{i c g}
- Mycetophila autumnalis Lundstrom, 1909^{c g}
- Mycetophila avicularia Freeman, 1951^{c g}
- Mycetophila axeli Duret, 1985^{c g}
- Mycetophila bachmanni Duret, 1980^{c g}
- Mycetophila banhumai Lane, 1952^{c g}
- Mycetophila barrettoi Lane, 1947^{c g}
- Mycetophila bartaki Sevcik, 2004^{c g}
- Mycetophila basalis Freeman, 1951^{c g}
- Mycetophila bejaranoi Duret, 1981^{c g}
- Mycetophila bentincki (Laffoon, 1957)^{i g}
- Mycetophila bertae Duret, 1979^{c g}
- Mycetophila bialorussica Dziedzicki, 1884^{c g}
- Mycetophila bifida Freeman, 1954^{c g}
- Mycetophila bifila Freeman, 1951^{c g}
- Mycetophila biflagellata Duret, 1991^{c g}
- Mycetophila biformata Duret, 1986^{c g}
- Mycetophila biformis Duret, 1992^{c g}
- Mycetophila binotata Walker, 1856^{c g}
- Mycetophila bipunctata Loew, 1869^{i c g}
- Mycetophila bisetosa Freeman, 1951^{c g}
- Mycetophila biusta Wiedemann, 1818^{c g}
- Mycetophila bivittata (Strobl, 1880)^{c g}
- Mycetophila blagoderovi Zaitzev, 1998^{c g}
- Mycetophila blanchardi Enderlein, 1910^{c g}
- Mycetophila blanda Winnertz, 1863^{c g}
- Mycetophila bohartorum (Laffoon, 1957)^{i c g}
- Mycetophila bohemica (Lastovka, 1963)^{c g}
- Mycetophila bolbachiensis Duret, 1987^{c g}
- Mycetophila boracensis Lane, 1948^{c g}
- Mycetophila boreocruciator Sevcik, 2003^{c g}
- Mycetophila borgmeieri Edwards, 1932^{c g}
- Mycetophila borneana Edwards, 1933^{c g}
- Mycetophila brachypoda Ostroverkhova, 1979^{c g}
- Mycetophila brachyptera Duret, 1989^{c g}
- Mycetophila brasiliensis (Enderlein, 1910)^{c g}
- Mycetophila brethesi Duret, 1981^{c g}
- Mycetophila brevicornis (Meigen, 1838)^{c g}
- Mycetophila brevifurcata Freeman, 1951^{c g}
- Mycetophila brevitarsata (Lastovka, 1963)^{c g}
- Mycetophila breyeri Duret, 1981^{c g}
- Mycetophila bridgesi Lane, 1963^{c g}
- Mycetophila britannica Lastovka & Kidd, 1975^{c g}
- Mycetophila browningi (Laffoon, 1957)^{i c g}
- Mycetophila bruchi Duret, 1981^{c g}
- Mycetophila brunnescens Freeman, 1951^{c g}
- Mycetophila byersi (Laffoon, 1957)^{i c g}
- Mycetophila calvuscuta Wu, He & Yang, 1998^{c g}
- Mycetophila campbellensis Harrison, 1964^{c g}
- Mycetophila canicula Freeman, 1951^{c g}
- Mycetophila capreolata (Laffoon, 1957)^{i c g}
- Mycetophila caprii Duret, 1981^{c g}
- Mycetophila caribai Lane, 1955^{c g}
- Mycetophila caripunai Lane, 1955^{c g}
- Mycetophila carpinteroi Duret, 1980^{c g}
- Mycetophila carrerai Lane, 1958^{c g}
- Mycetophila carruthi Shaw, 1951^{i c g}
- Mycetophila catharinae Edwards, 1932^{c g}
- Mycetophila caudata Staeger, 1840^{i c g}
- Mycetophila caudatusaceus Wu, He & Yang, 1998^{c g}
- Mycetophila caurina (Laffoon, 1957)^{i c g}
- Mycetophila cavalierii Duret, 1981^{c g}
- Mycetophila cavillator (Laffoon, 1957)^{i c g}
- Mycetophila cayuensis Lane, 1955^{c g}
- Mycetophila cekalovici Duret, 1980^{c g}
- Mycetophila celator (Laffoon, 1957)^{i c g}
- Mycetophila chamberlini (Laffoon, 1957)^{i c g}
- Mycetophila chandleri Wu, 1997^{c g}
- Mycetophila chaoi Wu & He, 1997^{c g}
- Mycetophila chilena Duret, 1979^{c g}
- Mycetophila chilenensis Duret, 1985^{c g}
- Mycetophila chillanensis Duret, 1981^{c g}
- Mycetophila chiloensis Duret, 1981^{c g}
- Mycetophila chinguensis Duret, 1985^{c g}
- Mycetophila chlorochroa Freeman, 1951^{c g}
- Mycetophila chubutensis Duret, 1991^{c g}
- Mycetophila cingulum Meigen, 1830^{i c g}
- Mycetophila clara Tonnoir & Edwards, 1927^{c g}
- Mycetophila clarovittata Freeman, 1951^{c g}
- Mycetophila clavata Van Duzee, 1928^{i g}
- Mycetophila clavigera Freeman, 1951^{c g}
- Mycetophila clydeae Duret, 1986^{c g}
- Mycetophila clypeata Wu, He & Yang, 1998^{c g}
- Mycetophila coenosa Wu, 1997^{c g}
- Mycetophila cognata Philippi, 1865^{c g}
- Mycetophila collineola (Speiser, 1909)^{c g}
- Mycetophila colorata Tonnoir & Edwards, 1927^{c g}
- Mycetophila comata (Laffoon, 1957)^{i c g}
- Mycetophila concinna (Laffoon, 1957)^{i c g}
- Mycetophila confluens Dziedzicki, 1884^{c g}
- Mycetophila confusa Dziedzicki, 1884^{c g}
- Mycetophila conica Tonnoir & Edwards, 1927^{c g}
- Mycetophila conifera Freeman, 1951^{c g}
- Mycetophila conjuncta Freeman, 1951^{c g}
- Mycetophila consobrina Tonnoir & Edwards, 1927^{c g}
- Mycetophila consonans (Laffoon, 1957)^{i c g}
- Mycetophila constricta Freeman, 1951^{c g}
- Mycetophila contigua Walker, 1848^{i c g}
- Mycetophila continens Becker, 1908^{c g}
- Mycetophila cordillerana Duret, 1985^{c g}
- Mycetophila cornuta Freeman, 1951^{c g}
- Mycetophila corsica Edwards, 1928^{c g}
- Mycetophila coscaroni Duret, 1980^{c g}
- Mycetophila costaricensis Lane, 1958^{c g}
- Mycetophila coxiponesi Lane, 1958^{c g}
- Mycetophila crassicornis (Roser, 1840)^{c g}
- Mycetophila crassiseta (Laffoon, 1957)^{i c g}
- Mycetophila crassitarsis Tonnoir & Edwards, 1927^{c g}
- Mycetophila cruciator (Laffoon, 1957)^{i c g}
- Mycetophila curiaensis Lane, 1952^{c g}
- Mycetophila curtisi Tonnoir & Edwards, 1927^{c g}
- Mycetophila curvicaudata Wu, 1997^{c g}
- Mycetophila curvilinea Brunetti, 1912^{c g}
- Mycetophila curviseta Lundstrom, 1911^{c g}
- Mycetophila czizeki Landrock, 1911^{c g}
- Mycetophila dalcahuensis Duret, 1991^{c g}
- Mycetophila decarloi Duret, 1983^{c g}
- Mycetophila deceitensis Duret, 1991^{c g}
- Mycetophila deflexa Chandler, 2001^{c g}
- Mycetophila delgadoi Duret, 1981^{c g}
- Mycetophila demacuri Lane, 1955^{c g}
- Mycetophila dentata Lundstrom, 1913^{i c g}
- Mycetophila desantisi Duret, 1981^{c g}
- Mycetophila devia (Laffoon, 1957)^{i g}
- Mycetophila devioides Bechev, 1988^{c g}
- Mycetophila dichaeta Freeman, 1951^{c g}
- Mycetophila difficilis (Bukowski, 1934)^{c g}
- Mycetophila diffusa Tonnoir & Edwards, 1927^{c g}
- Mycetophila digna Plassmann & Vogel, 1990^{c g}
- Mycetophila digtalis Freeman, 1951^{c g}
- Mycetophila dilatata Tonnoir & Edwards, 1927^{c g}
- Mycetophila diligens Zaitzev, 1999^{c g}
- Mycetophila discors (Laffoon, 1957)^{i c g}
- Mycetophila disparata Plassmann & Schacht, 1990^{c g}
- Mycetophila distigma Meigen, 1830^{c g}
- Mycetophila distincta Freeman, 1951^{c g}
- Mycetophila dististylata (Sasakawa, 1964)^{c g}
- Mycetophila dolichocenta Wu & He, 1997^{c g}
- Mycetophila dollyae Duret, 1979^{c g}
- Mycetophila dollylanfrancoae Duret, 1983^{c g}
- Mycetophila dolosa Williston, 1896^{c g}
- Mycetophila dominica Curran, 1927^{c g}
- Mycetophila drepana Wu, He & Yang, 1998^{c g}
- Mycetophila duodevia Plassmann & Schacht, 2002^{c g}
- Mycetophila dziedzickii Chandler, 1977^{c g}
- Mycetophila edura Johannsen, 1912^{i c g}
- Mycetophila edwardsi Lundstrom, 1913^{c g}
- Mycetophila elegans Tonnoir & Edwards, 1927^{g}
- Mycetophila elongata Tonnoir & Edwards, 1927^{c g}
- Mycetophila enthea Zaitzev, 1998^{c g}
- Mycetophila eppingensis Chandler, 2001^{c g}
- Mycetophila eramanensis Lane, 1955^{c g}
- Mycetophila erecta Duret, 1992^{c g}
- Mycetophila estonica Kurina, 1992^{c g}
- Mycetophila evanida Lastovka, 1972^{c g}
- Mycetophila exstincta Loew, 1869^{i c g}
- Mycetophila faceta (Laffoon, 1957)^{i c g}
- Mycetophila fagi Marshall, 1896^{c g}
- Mycetophila fagnanoensis Duret, 1991^{c g}
- Mycetophila falcata Johannsen, 1912^{i g}
- Mycetophila fasciata Meigen, 1804^{g}
- Mycetophila fascinator (Laffoon, 1957)^{i c g}
- Mycetophila fascipennis Philippi, 1865^{c g}
- Mycetophila fatua Johannsen, 1912^{i c g}
- Mycetophila favonica Chandler, 1993^{c g}
- Mycetophila fenestratula Becker, 1908^{c g}
- Mycetophila fereina Plassmann & Schacht, 2002^{c g}
- Mycetophila fernandezi Duret, 1981^{c g}
- Mycetophila ferrazi Lane, 1955^{c g}
- Mycetophila ferruginea (Walker, 1836)^{c g}
- Mycetophila filiae Zaitzev, 1998^{c g}
- Mycetophila filicronis Tonnoir & Edwards, 1927^{c g}
- Mycetophila finlandica Edwards, 1913^{i c g}
- Mycetophila fisherae (Laffoon, 1957)^{i c g b}
- Mycetophila flabellifera Freeman, 1951^{c g}
- Mycetophila flava Winnertz, 1863^{g}
- Mycetophila flavipes (Macquart, 1826)^{c g}
- Mycetophila flavithorax Freeman, 1951^{c g}
- Mycetophila flavoconjuncta Duret, 1987^{c g}
- Mycetophila flavolineata (Bukowski, 1934)^{c g}
- Mycetophila flavolunata Freeman, 1951^{c g}
- Mycetophila flexiseta Freeman, 1951^{c g}
- Mycetophila fluctata Becker, 1908^{c g}
- Mycetophila foecunda Johannsen, 1912^{i c g}
- Mycetophila forattinii Lane, 1955^{c g}
- Mycetophila forcipata Lundstrom, 1913^{c g}
- Mycetophila formosa Lundstrom, 1911^{c g}
- Mycetophila fortisa Wu, 1997^{c g}
- Mycetophila franzi Plassmann, 1977^{c g}
- Mycetophila fraterna Winnertz, 1863^{c g}
- Mycetophila freemani Lane, 1948^{c g}
- Mycetophila freyi Lundstrom, 1909^{c g}
- Mycetophila fritzi Duret, 1980^{c g}
- Mycetophila frustrator (Laffoon, 1957)^{i c g}
- Mycetophila fueguina Duret, 1980^{c g}
- Mycetophila fulva (Winnertz, 1863)^{c g}
- Mycetophila fulvicollis (Stannius, 1831)^{c g}
- Mycetophila fulvithorax (Strobl, 1910)^{c g}
- Mycetophila fumosa Tonnoir & Edwards, 1927^{c g}
- Mycetophila funerea Freeman, 1951^{c g}
- Mycetophila fungorum (De Geer, 1776)^{i c g}
- Mycetophila furtiva Tonnoir & Edwards, 1927^{c g}
- Mycetophila furvusa Wu, 1997^{c g}
- Mycetophila fusconitens Becker, 1908^{c g}
- Mycetophila galibisi Lane, 1955^{c g}
- Mycetophila garciai Duret, 1981^{c g}
- Mycetophila garridoi Duret, 1980^{c g}
- Mycetophila gentilicia Zaitzev, 1999^{c g}
- Mycetophila gentilii Duret, 1980^{c g}
- Mycetophila genuflexuosa Wu, He & Yang, 1998^{c g}
- Mycetophila ghanii Shaw, 1951^{i c g}
- Mycetophila gibbula Edwards, 1925^{c g}
- Mycetophila glabra Wu, He & Yang, 1998^{c g}
- Mycetophila golbachi Lane, 1958^{c g}
- Mycetophila golbachiani Duret, 1987^{c g}
- Mycetophila gradata Freeman, 1951^{c g}
- Mycetophila grandis Tonnoir & Edwards, 1927^{c g}
- Mycetophila grata Wu, He & Yang, 1998^{c g}
- Mycetophila gratiosa Winnertz, 1863^{c g}
- Mycetophila griseofusca Tonnoir & Edwards, 1927^{c g}
- Mycetophila grisescens Tonnoir & Edwards, 1927^{c g}
- Mycetophila guanasi Lane, 1958^{c g}
- Mycetophila guaraiasi Lane, 1952^{c g}
- Mycetophila guatensis Lane, 1955^{c g}
- Mycetophila hamata Winnertz, 1863^{c g}
- Mycetophila harrisi Tonnoir & Edwards, 1927^{c g}
- Mycetophila haruspica Plassmann, 1990^{c g}
- Mycetophila hepperi Duret, 1981^{c g}
- Mycetophila hermani Duret, 1985^{c g}
- Mycetophila heterochaeta Ostroverkhova, 1979^{c g}
- Mycetophila heteroneura Philippi, 1865^{c g}
- Mycetophila hetschkoi Landrock, 1918^{c g}
- Mycetophila hilaris (Dufour, 1839)^{c g}
- Mycetophila hilversidae Zaitzev, 1998^{c g}
- Mycetophila hiulca (Laffoon, 1957)^{i c g}
- Mycetophila hormosensis Duret, 1991^{c g}
- Mycetophila horrida Ostroverkhova, 1979^{c g}
- Mycetophila howletti Marshall, 1896^{c g}
- Mycetophila humboldti Lane, 1948^{c g}
- Mycetophila hutsoni Duret, 1981^{c g}
- Mycetophila hyrcania Lastovka & Matile, 1969^{c g}
- Mycetophila ibarragrassoi Duret, 1986^{c g}
- Mycetophila ibarrai Duret, 1981^{c g}
- Mycetophila ichneumonea Say, 1823^{i c g}
- Mycetophila icosi Lane, 1958^{c g}
- Mycetophila idonea Lastovka, 1972^{c g}
- Mycetophila iheringi Lane, 1948^{c g}
- Mycetophila illita Freeman, 1951^{c g}
- Mycetophila illudens (Laffoon, 1957)^{i c g}
- Mycetophila immaculata Dziedzicki, 1884^{c g}
- Mycetophila impeccabilis Zaitzev, 1999^{c g}
- Mycetophila impellans (Johannsen, 1912)^{i c g}
- Mycetophila impunctata Tonnoir & Edwards, 1927^{c g}
- Mycetophila incompleta (Macquart, 1826)^{c g}
- Mycetophila indecisa Duret, 1985^{c g}
- Mycetophila indiana Duret, 1986^{c g}
- Mycetophila indigena Duret, 1986^{c g}
- Mycetophila inermis Dufour, 1839^{c g}
- Mycetophila inquisita Zaitzev, 1999^{c g}
- Mycetophila insecta Freeman, 1951^{c g}
- Mycetophila insipiens (Williston, 1896)^{c g}
- Mycetophila integra Tonnoir & Edwards, 1927^{c g}
- Mycetophila intermedia Tonnoir & Edwards, 1927^{c g}
- Mycetophila interrita Plassmann & Vogel, 1990^{c g}
- Mycetophila interrupta Becker, 1908^{c g}
- Mycetophila intortusa Wu, He & Yang, 1998^{c g}
- Mycetophila irregularis Kallweit, 1995^{c g}
- Mycetophila isabelae Duret, 1981^{c g}
- Mycetophila ishiharai Sasakawa, 1994^{c g}
- Mycetophila itascae (Laffoon, 1957)^{i c g}
- Mycetophila javaesi Lane, 1955^{c g}
- Mycetophila josepastranai Duret, 1991^{c g}
- Mycetophila jucunda Johannsen, 1912^{i c g}
- Mycetophila jugata Johannsen, 1912^{i c g}
- Mycetophila juinensis Lane, 1952^{c g}
- Mycetophila juri Lane, 1955^{c g}
- Mycetophila jurunensis Lane, 1955^{c g}
- Mycetophila kaingangi Lane, 1956^{c g}
- Mycetophila karpathica Landrock, 1925^{c g}
- Mycetophila karthalae Matile, 1979^{c g}
- Mycetophila kunasensis Lane, 1955^{c g}
- Mycetophila lacuna Freeman, 1951^{c g}
- Mycetophila laeta Walker, 1848^{i c g}
- Mycetophila laffooni Lastkova, 1972^{i c g}
- Mycetophila laianasi Lane, 1958^{c g}
- Mycetophila lamellata Lundstrom, 1911^{c g}
- Mycetophila lanfrancoae Duret, 1977^{c g}
- Mycetophila laninae Duret, 1992^{c g}
- Mycetophila laninensis Duret, 1981^{c g}
- Mycetophila lapponica Lundstrom, 1906^{c g}
- Mycetophila lastovkai Caspers, 1984^{c g}
- Mycetophila lateralis Meigen, 1818^{c g}
- Mycetophila latichaeta Wu, He & Yang, 1998^{c g}
- Mycetophila latifascia Tonnoir & Edwards, 1927^{c g}
- Mycetophila lativitta Freeman, 1951^{c g}
- Mycetophila lenis Johannsen, 1912^{i c g}
- Mycetophila lenta Johannsen, 1912^{i c g}
- Mycetophila leonyivoffi Duret, 1991^{c g}
- Mycetophila limata (Laffoon, 1957)^{i c g}
- Mycetophila limbata Lundstrom, 1911^{c g}
- Mycetophila lineicoxa Edwards, 1928^{c g}
- Mycetophila lineola Meigen, 1818^{c g}
- Mycetophila lobulata Zaitzev, 1999^{c g}
- Mycetophila lomodensis Tonnoir & Edwards, 1927^{c g}
- Mycetophila longiseta Ostroverkhova, 1979^{c g}
- Mycetophila longwangshana Wu, He & Yang, 1998^{c g}
- Mycetophila lonquimayensis Duret, 1991^{c g}
- Mycetophila lubomirskii Dziedzicki, 1884^{c g}
- Mycetophila lucidithorax (Bukowski, 1934)^{c g}
- Mycetophila luctuosa Meigen, 1830^{i c g}
- Mycetophila luederwaldti (Enderlein, 1910)^{c g}
- Mycetophila luispenai Duret, 1980^{c g}
- Mycetophila lunata Meigen, 1804^{c g}
- Mycetophila lurida Meigen, 1818^{c g}
- Mycetophila luteolateralis Tonnoir & Edwards, 1927^{c g}
- Mycetophila macrocephala Duret, 1986^{c g}
- Mycetophila maculata (Macquart, 1834)^{g}
- Mycetophila madocella Chandler & Ribeiro, 1995^{c g}
- Mycetophila magallanensis Duret, 1986^{c g}
- Mycetophila magallanica Duret, 1977^{c g}
- Mycetophila magnicauda Strobl, 1895^{c g}
- Mycetophila mallecoana Duret, 1991^{c g}
- Mycetophila mallecoensis Duret, 1981^{c g}
- Mycetophila mapuchesi Duret, 1986^{c g}
- Mycetophila margaritae Duret, 1981^{c g}
- Mycetophila marginata Winnertz, 1863^{c g}
- Mycetophila marginepunctata Tonnoir & Edwards, 1927^{c g}
- Mycetophila marginisetosa Sasakawa, 2005^{c g}
- Mycetophila mariluisi Duret, 1981^{c g}
- Mycetophila marshalli Enderlein, 1910^{c g}
- Mycetophila martinezi Duret, 1980^{c g}
- Mycetophila martinici Duret, 1979^{c g}
- Mycetophila mathesoni Lane, 1948^{c g}
- Mycetophila matsumurai Lastovka, 1972^{c g}
- Mycetophila maurii Duret, 1981^{c g}
- Mycetophila media Tonnoir & Edwards, 1927^{c g}
- Mycetophila merdigera Knab & Zwaluwenburg, 1918^{c g}
- Mycetophila meridionalisa Wu, 1997^{c g}
- Mycetophila mesorphina Speiser, 1911^{c g}
- Mycetophila mikii Dziedzicki, 1884^{c g}
- Mycetophila minima Tonnoir & Edwards, 1927^{c g}
- Mycetophila minuta Ostroverkhova, 1979^{c g}
- Mycetophila mitis (Johannsen, 1912)^{i c g}
- Mycetophila mohilevensis Dziedzicki, 1884^{g}
- Mycetophila mohilivensis Dziedzicki, 1884^{c g}
- Mycetophila monostigma Wiedemann, 1818^{c g}
- Mycetophila monstera Maximova, 2002^{c g}
- Mycetophila montana Landrock, 1925^{c g}
- Mycetophila montealtensis Duret, 1979^{c g}
- Mycetophila morata Zaitzev, 1999^{c g}
- Mycetophila moravica Landrock, 1925^{i c g}
- Mycetophila morosa Winnertz, 1863^{c g}
- Mycetophila multiplex Freeman, 1951^{c g}
- Mycetophila nahuelbutaensis Duret, 1983^{c g}
- Mycetophila nahuelhuapi Duret, 1985^{c g}
- Mycetophila nana (Macquart, 1826)^{c g}
- Mycetophila napaea (Laffoon, 1957)^{i c g}
- Mycetophila naratakevora (Okada, 1939)^{c g}
- Mycetophila naumanni Duret, 1992^{c g}
- Mycetophila nebulosa (Stannius, 1831)^{c g}
- Mycetophila nemorivaga Zaitzev, 1998^{c g}
- Mycetophila neoclavigera Duret, 1986^{c g}
- Mycetophila neoconifera Duret, 1985^{c g}
- Mycetophila neoconjuncta Duret, 1987^{c g}
- Mycetophila neoconstricta Duret, 1992^{c g}
- Mycetophila neoflavithorax Duret, 1992^{c g}
- Mycetophila neofunerea Duret, 1992^{c g}
- Mycetophila neofungorum Chandler, 1993^{c g}
- Mycetophila neolorigera Duret, 1991^{c g}
- Mycetophila neomacrocephala Duret, 1991^{c g}
- Mycetophila neomapuchesi Duret, 1986^{c g}
- Mycetophila neoparapicalis Duret, 1986^{c g}
- Mycetophila neopucatrihuana Duret, 1992^{c g}
- Mycetophila neotriangulifera Duret, 1991^{c g}
- Mycetophila nervitacta Freeman, 1951^{c g}
- Mycetophila neuquina Duret, 1981^{c g}
- Mycetophila neuquinensis Duret, 1985^{c g}
- Mycetophila nigrescens Freeman, 1951^{c g}
- Mycetophila nigricans Tonnoir & Edwards, 1927^{c g}
- Mycetophila nigricincta (Stannius, 1831)^{c g}
- Mycetophila nigripalpis Tonnoir & Edwards, 1927^{c g}
- Mycetophila nigriventris Philippi, 1865^{g}
- Mycetophila nigrofusca Dziedzicki, 1884^{c g}
- Mycetophila nigromadera Chandler & Ribeiro, 1995^{c g}
- Mycetophila nitens Tonnoir & Edwards, 1927^{c g}
- Mycetophila nitidula Tonnoir & Edwards, 1927^{c g}
- Mycetophila nodulosa Williston, 1896^{c g}
- Mycetophila notata Freeman, 1951^{c g}
- Mycetophila nubila (Say, 1829)^{c g}
- Mycetophila nublensis Lane, 1962^{c g}
- Mycetophila obscura (Walker, 1848)^{c g}
- Mycetophila obscuripennis Blanchard, 1852^{c g}
- Mycetophila obsoleta (Zetterstedt, 1852)^{c g}
- Mycetophila ocellus Walker, 1848^{i c g}
- Mycetophila ocultans Lundstrom, 1913^{c g}
- Mycetophila oligodona Wu, He & Yang, 1998^{c g}
- Mycetophila oligoneura (Stannius, 1831)^{c g}
- Mycetophila olivae Duret, 1983^{c g}
- Mycetophila onasi Duret, 1980^{c g}
- Mycetophila oratorila Wu & Yang, 1997^{c g}
- Mycetophila ordinseta Freeman, 1951^{c g}
- Mycetophila ornata Stephens, 1829^{c g}
- Mycetophila ornatidorsum (Enderlein, 1910)^{c g}
- Mycetophila ornatipennis Blanchard, 1852^{c g}
- Mycetophila ornatissima Tonnoir & Edwards, 1927^{c g}
- Mycetophila osornoana Duret, 1991^{c g}
- Mycetophila osornoensis Duret, 1981^{c g}
- Mycetophila ostensackenii Dziedzicki, 1884^{c g}
- Mycetophila ostentanea Zaitzev, 1998^{c g}
- Mycetophila palaciosi Duret, 1981^{c g}
- Mycetophila pallida (Bukowski, 1934)^{g}
- Mycetophila pallidicornis (Macquart, 1826)^{c g}
- Mycetophila pallipes (Meigen, 1838)^{c g}
- Mycetophila paracapitata Duret, 1991^{c g}
- Mycetophila paraconifera Duret, 1985^{c g}
- Mycetophila paraconjuncta Duret, 1987^{c g}
- Mycetophila paraconstricta Duret, 1981^{c g}
- Mycetophila paracruciator Lastovka & Matile, 1974^{c g}
- Mycetophila paradisa Wu, He & Yang, 1998^{c g}
- Mycetophila parafunerea Duret, 1992^{c g}
- Mycetophila paralativitta Duret, 1991^{c g}
- Mycetophila paranervitacta Duret, 1987^{c g}
- Mycetophila paranotata Freeman, 1954^{c g}
- Mycetophila paraonasi Duret, 1980^{c g}
- Mycetophila paraordiniseta Duret, 1979^{c g}
- Mycetophila parapellucida Duret, 1981^{c g}
- Mycetophila parapicalis Freeman, 1954^{c g}
- Mycetophila parapucatrihuana Duret, 1992^{c g}
- Mycetophila parasubfusca Duret, 1981^{c g}
- Mycetophila parata Zaitzev, 1998^{c g}
- Mycetophila paratehuechesi Duret, 1991^{c g}
- Mycetophila paraunicornuta Duret, 1991^{c g}
- Mycetophila parawillineri Duret, 1992^{c g}
- Mycetophila parva Walker, 1848^{i c g}
- Mycetophila parvifasciata (Santos Abreu, 1920)^{c g}
- Mycetophila parvimaculata Van Duzee, 1928^{i c g}
- Mycetophila parvula Ostroverkhova, 1979^{c g}
- Mycetophila passei Lane, 1952^{c g}
- Mycetophila pastranai Duret, 1981^{c g}
- Mycetophila patagoiensis Duret, 1991^{c g}
- Mycetophila patagonesi Lane, 1958^{c g}
- Mycetophila patagonica Duret, 1979^{c g}
- Mycetophila patagoniensis Duret, 1989^{c g}
- Mycetophila paula (Loew, 1869)^{i c g}
- Mycetophila paxillata (Laffooon, 1957)^{i c g}
- Mycetophila pecinai (Lastovka, 1963)^{c g}
- Mycetophila pectinata Freeman, 1951^{c g}
- Mycetophila pectita Johannsen, 1912^{i c g}
- Mycetophila pellucida Freeman, 1951^{c g}
- Mycetophila penai Duret, 1981^{c g}
- Mycetophila penicillata Sasakawa, 2005^{c g}
- Mycetophila peniculata Freeman, 1951^{c g}
- Mycetophila percursa (Laffoon, 1957)^{i c g}
- Mycetophila perita Johannsen, 1912^{i c g}
- Mycetophila perpallida Chandler, 1993^{c g}
- Mycetophila perpauca Lastovka, 1972^{c g}
- Mycetophila petulca Zaitzev, 1998^{c g}
- Mycetophila philomycesa Wu, 1997^{c g}
- Mycetophila phyllura Tonnoir & Edwards, 1927^{c g}
- Mycetophila picea Freeman, 1951^{c g}
- Mycetophila picta (Macquart, 1834)^{g}
- Mycetophila pictula Meigen, 1830^{i c g}
- Mycetophila pinarensis Duret, 1986^{c g}
- Mycetophila pinguis Loew, 1869^{i c g}
- Mycetophila piranoi Duret, 1981^{c g}
- Mycetophila pirapesi Lane, 1958^{c g}
- Mycetophila placata Plassmann & Vogel, 1990^{c g}
- Mycetophila plaumanni Lane, 1958^{c g}
- Mycetophila plotnikovae Zaitzev, 2004^{g}
- Mycetophila pollicata Edwards, 1927^{c g}
- Mycetophila poloninensis Sevcik, 2004^{c g}
- Mycetophila porteri Duret, 1981^{c g}
- Mycetophila prionoda Wu, He & Yang, 1998^{c g}
- Mycetophila procera Loew, 1869^{i c g}
- Mycetophila propinqua Walker, 1848^{i c g}
- Mycetophila propria Skuse, 1888^{c g}
- Mycetophila proseni Duret, 1981^{c g}
- Mycetophila pseudoaltensis Duret, 1980^{c g}
- Mycetophila pseudoaraucana Duret, 1986^{c g}
- Mycetophila pseudoclavigera Duret, 1985^{c g}
- Mycetophila pseudoconifera Duret, 1985^{c g}
- Mycetophila pseudodigitalis Duret, 1991^{c g}
- Mycetophila pseudoforcipata Zaitzev, 1998^{c g}
- Mycetophila pseudofunerea Duret, 1992^{c g}
- Mycetophila pseudomarshalli Tonnoir & Edwards, 1927^{c g}
- Mycetophila pseudonervitacta Duret, 1987^{c g}
- Mycetophila pseudopellucida Duret, 1981^{c g}
- Mycetophila pseudopenai Duret, 1981^{c g}
- Mycetophila pseudopicea Duret, 1983^{c g}
- Mycetophila pseudoquadra (Bukowski, 1934)^{c g}
- Mycetophila pseudoquadroides Matile, 1967^{c g}
- Mycetophila pseudoviridipes Duret, 1980^{c g}
- Mycetophila pucara Duret, 1986^{c g}
- Mycetophila pucaraensis Duret, 1973^{c g}
- Mycetophila pucarani Duret, 1985^{c g}
- Mycetophila pucarensis Duret, 1973^{c g}
- Mycetophila pucatrihuana Duret, 1992^{c g}
- Mycetophila pucatrihuensis Duret, 1981^{c g}
- Mycetophila puelchesi Duret, 1986^{c g}
- Mycetophila pumila Winnertz, 1863^{c g}
- Mycetophila punctipennis (Stannius, 1831)^{c g}
- Mycetophila punensis Lane, 1955^{c g}
- Mycetophila puyehuensis Duret, 1991^{c g}
- Mycetophila pygmaea (Macquart, 1826)^{c g}
- Mycetophila pyrenaica Matile, 1967^{c g}
- Mycetophila quadra Lundstrom, 1909^{c g}
- Mycetophila quadrifasciata (Brunetti, 1912)^{c g}
- Mycetophila quadrimaculata (Bukowski, 1934)^{c g}
- Mycetophila ramosa Freeman, 1951^{c g}
- Mycetophila recta (Johannsen, 1912)^{i g}
- Mycetophila recula (Laffoon, 1957)^{i c g}
- Mycetophila reversa Edwards, 1931^{c g}
- Mycetophila riparia Chandler, 1993^{c g}
- Mycetophila ronderosi Duret, 1981^{c g}
- Mycetophila rosularia Ostroverkhova, 1979^{c g}
- Mycetophila rubensis Duret, 1981^{c g}
- Mycetophila rudis Winnertz, 1863^{c g}
- Mycetophila ruficollis Meigen, 1818^{i g}
- Mycetophila russata Dziedzicki, 1884^{c g}
- Mycetophila saltanensis Lane, 1955^{c g}
- Mycetophila santosiana Stora, 1936^{c g}
- Mycetophila scalprata Zaitzev, 1998^{c g}
- Mycetophila schajovskoyi Duret, 1980^{c g}
- Mycetophila schistocauda Wu, He & Yang, 1998^{c g}
- Mycetophila schnablii (Dziedzicki, 1884)^{c g}
- Mycetophila scitula (Laffoon, 1957)^{i c g}
- Mycetophila scopata Wu, 2001^{g}
- Mycetophila scotica Edwards, 1941^{i c g}
- Mycetophila scourfieldi Duret, 1986^{c g}
- Mycetophila scutata Wu, He & Yang, 1998^{c g}
- Mycetophila seclusa (Laffoon, 1957)^{i c g}
- Mycetophila semifusca Meigen, 1818^{c g}
- Mycetophila senticosa Wu, He & Yang, 1998^{c g}
- Mycetophila septemtrionalis (Okada, 1939)^{c g}
- Mycetophila sepulta (Laffoon, 1957)^{i c g}
- Mycetophila sequestra Plassmann, 1976^{c g}
- Mycetophila sergioi Duret, 1973^{c g}
- Mycetophila sericea (Macquart, 1826)^{c g}
- Mycetophila sertata (Laffoon, 1957)^{i c g}
- Mycetophila setifera Zaitzev, 1999^{c g}
- Mycetophila shawi (Laffoon, 1957)^{i c g}
- Mycetophila sheni Wu & Yang, 1997^{c g}
- Mycetophila sibirica (Plotnikova, 1962)^{c g}
- Mycetophila sicyoideusa Wu, He & Yang, 1998^{c g}
- Mycetophila sierrae (Laffoon, 1957)^{i c g}
- Mycetophila sigillata Dziedzicki, 1884^{i c g}
- Mycetophila sigmoides Loew, 1869^{i c g b}
- Mycetophila signata Meigen, 1830^{c g}
- Mycetophila signatoides Dziedzicki, 1884^{i c g}
- Mycetophila similis (Santos Abreu, 1920)^{c g}
- Mycetophila simplex Freeman, 1951^{c g}
- Mycetophila simplicistila Freeman, 1951^{c g}
- Mycetophila sinuata Freeman, 1951^{c g}
- Mycetophila sinuosa Plassmann & Schacht, 1999^{c g}
- Mycetophila solita Freeman, 1951^{c g}
- Mycetophila solitaris Tonnoir & Edwards, 1927^{c g}
- Mycetophila sollistima Zaitzev, 1999^{c g}
- Mycetophila sordens (Wiedemann, 1817)^{c g}
- Mycetophila sordida Wulp, 1874^{i c g}
- Mycetophila sordida van-der Wulp, 1874^{g}
- Mycetophila sororia Zaitzev, 1998^{c g}
- Mycetophila spatiosa Wu, He & Yang, 1998^{c g}
- Mycetophila spectabilis Winnertz, 1863^{c g}
- Mycetophila spinigera Tonnoir & Edwards, 1927^{c g}
- Mycetophila spinilineata Sasakawa, 2005^{c g}
- Mycetophila spinipes Freeman, 1951^{c g}
- Mycetophila spinosa Freeman, 1951^{c g}
- Mycetophila splendida Lane, 1948^{c g}
- Mycetophila spleniata (Laffoon, 1957)^{i c g}
- Mycetophila stolida Walker, 1856^{i c g}
- Mycetophila stonei Lane, 1952^{c g}
- Mycetophila storai Chandler & Ribeiro, 1995^{c g}
- Mycetophila stricklandi (Laffoon, 1957)^{i c g}
- Mycetophila strigata Staeger, 1840^{i c g}
- Mycetophila strigatoides (Lundrock, 1927)^{i c g}
- Mycetophila strikeri Duret, 1981^{c g}
- Mycetophila strobli Lastovka, 1972^{c g}
- Mycetophila stupposa Wu, He & Yang, 1998^{c g}
- Mycetophila stylata (Dziedzicki, 1884)^{c g}
- Mycetophila stylatiformis Landrock, 1925^{c g}
- Mycetophila subbrevitarsata Zaitzev, 1999^{c g}
- Mycetophila subcapitata Freeman, 1954^{c g}
- Mycetophila subconstricta Duret, 1981^{c g}
- Mycetophila subfumosa Freeman, 1954^{c g}
- Mycetophila subfunerea Duret, 1992^{c g}
- Mycetophila subfusca Freeman, 1951^{c g}
- Mycetophila subita (Laffoon, 1957)^{i c g}
- Mycetophila sublaninensis Duret, 1981^{c g}
- Mycetophila sublunata Zaitzev, 1998^{c g}
- Mycetophila submarshalli Tonnoir & Edwards, 1927^{c g}
- Mycetophila subnigrofusca Zaitzev, 1998^{c g}
- Mycetophila subnitens Tonnoir & Edwards, 1927^{c g}
- Mycetophila subrecta Freeman, 1954^{c g}
- Mycetophila subrunnea Freeman, 1951^{c g}
- Mycetophila subscutellaris (Lindner, 1958)^{c g}
- Mycetophila subsigillata Zaitzev, 1999^{c g}
- Mycetophila subspinigera Tonnoir & Edwards, 1927^{c g}
- Mycetophila subtenebrosa Tonnoir & Edwards, 1927^{c g}
- Mycetophila subtillis Tonnoir & Edwards, 1927^{c g}
- Mycetophila suburbana Ostroverkhova, 1979^{c g}
- Mycetophila subvittata Freeman, 1954^{c g}
- Mycetophila suffusa Brunetti, 1912^{c g}
- Mycetophila suffusala Chandler & Ribeiro, 1995^{c g}
- Mycetophila sumavica (Lastovka, 1963)^{c g}
- Mycetophila sylvatica Marshall, 1896^{g}
- Mycetophila tacuensis Lane, 1952^{c g}
- Mycetophila talaris Freeman, 1951^{c g}
- Mycetophila tantula Plassmann & Vogel, 1990^{c g}
- Mycetophila tapinirai Lane, 1955^{c g}
- Mycetophila taplejungensis Kallweit, 1995^{c g}
- Mycetophila tapleyi Tonnoir & Edwards, 1927^{c g}
- Mycetophila tapuiai Lane, 1958^{c g}
- Mycetophila tehuelchesi Duret, 1979^{c g}
- Mycetophila telei Zaitzev, 1999^{c g}
- Mycetophila temucoensis Duret, 1986^{c g}
- Mycetophila tenebrosa Tonnoir & Edwards, 1927^{c g}
- Mycetophila theresae Edwards, 1932^{c g}
- Mycetophila thioptera Shaw, 1940^{i c g}
- Mycetophila tiefii Strobl, 1901^{c g}
- Mycetophila tobasi Lane, 1958^{c g}
- Mycetophila tolhuacaensis Duret, 1983^{c g}
- Mycetophila tomensis Plotnikova, 1962^{g}
- Mycetophila tonnoiri Matile, 1989^{c g}
- Mycetophila trancasensis Duret, 1992^{c g}
- Mycetophila triaculeata Ostroverkhova, 1977^{c g}
- Mycetophila triangularis Lundstrom, 1912^{c g}
- Mycetophila triangulata Dziedzicki, 1884^{c g}
- Mycetophila triangulifera Freeman, 1951^{c g}
- Mycetophila triappendiculata Duret, 1985^{c g}
- Mycetophila tridentata Lundstrom, 1911^{c g}
- Mycetophila trimacula Edwards, 1928^{c g}
- Mycetophila trinotata Staeger, 1840^{i c g}
- Mycetophila triordinata Freeman, 1954^{c g}
- Mycetophila triseriata (Bukowski, 1949)^{c g}
- Mycetophila trispinosa Tonnoir & Edwards, 1927^{c g}
- Mycetophila trivittata Freeman, 1951^{c g}
- Mycetophila tuberosa Lundstrom, 1911^{c g}
- Mycetophila tucumana Lane, 1958^{c g}
- Mycetophila tucunensis (Lane, 1955)^{c g}
- Mycetophila tungusica Ostroverkhova, 1979^{c g}
- Mycetophila tupanensis Lane, 1961^{c g}
- Mycetophila uacupisi Lane, 1958^{c g}
- Mycetophila uaianai Lane, 1952^{c g}
- Mycetophila uaicensis Lane, 1955^{c g}
- Mycetophila uboyasi Lane, 1955^{c g}
- Mycetophila uliginosa Chandler, 1988^{c g}
- Mycetophila unca Zaitzev, 1999^{c g}
- Mycetophila uncinata (Laffoon, 1957)^{i c g}
- Mycetophila uncta Plassmann, 1999^{c g}
- Mycetophila unguiculata Lundstrom, 1913^{c g}
- Mycetophila unicolor Stannius, 1831^{c g}
- Mycetophila unicornuta Freeman, 1951^{c g}
- Mycetophila uninotata Zetterstedt, 1852^{c g}
- Mycetophila unipunctata Meigen, 1818^{i c g b}
- Mycetophila uniseries Freeman, 1951^{c g}
- Mycetophila unispinosa Tonnoir & Edwards, 1927^{c g}
- Mycetophila variable Duret, 1986^{c g}
- Mycetophila vaurasi Lane, 1958^{c g}
- Mycetophila vegeta (Laffoon, 1957)^{i c g}
- Mycetophila veligera Freeman, 1951^{c g}
- Mycetophila venusta (Laffoon, 1957)^{i c g}
- Mycetophila verberifera Freeman, 1951^{c g}
- Mycetophila verecunda (Laffoon, 1957)^{i c g}
- Mycetophila vesca (Laffoon, 1957)^{i c g}
- Mycetophila vianai Duret, 1981^{c g}
- Mycetophila victoriaensis Duret, 1983^{c g}
- Mycetophila vigena Wu, He & Yang, 1998^{c g}
- Mycetophila virgata Tonnoir & Edwards, 1927^{c g}
- Mycetophila viridipes Freeman, 1951^{c g}
- Mycetophila viridis Tonnoir & Edwards, 1927^{c g}
- Mycetophila viticollis Blanchard, 1852^{c g}
- Mycetophila vitipennis Freeman, 1951^{c g}
- Mycetophila vittipes Zetterstedt, 1852^{c g}
- Mycetophila vivida Plassmann & Schacht, 1999^{c g}
- Mycetophila v-nigrum Lundstrom, 1913^{c g}
- Mycetophila volitans Lynch Arribalzaga, 1892^{c g}
- Mycetophila vulgaris Tonnoir & Edwards, 1927^{c g}
- Mycetophila willineri Duret, 1981^{c g}
- Mycetophila willinki Duret, 1981^{c g}
- Mycetophila winnertzi Lane, 1948^{c g}
- Mycetophila wirthi (Laffoon, 1957)^{i c g}
- Mycetophila wygodzinskyi Lane, 1947^{c g}
- Mycetophila xamasensis Lane, 1955^{c g}
- Mycetophila xanthopyga Winnertz, 1863^{c g}
- Mycetophila xanthotricha Mik, 1884^{c g}
- Mycetophila yaganesi Duret, 1980^{c g}
- Mycetophila yamanasi Duret, 1986^{c g}
- Mycetophila yivoffi Duret, 1981^{c g}
- Mycetophila yuriamuesi Lane, 1955^{c g}
- Mycetophila zetterstedtii Lundstrom, 1906^{c g}
- Mycetophila ziegleri Kurina, 2008^{c g}

Data sources: i = ITIS, c = Catalogue of Life, g = GBIF, b = Bugguide.net
