= List of Macrocera species =

This is a list of 196 species in Macrocera, a genus of predatory fungus gnats in the family Keroplatidae.

- M. abdominalis Okada, 1937^{c g}
- M. aegaea Matile, 1969^{g}
- M. africana Freeman, 1970^{c g}
- M. alacra Coher, 1988^{c g}
- M. albipunctata Matile, 1973^{c g}
- M. alpicola Winnertz, 1863^{c g}
- M. alpicoloides Okada, 1937^{c g}
- M. altaica Ostroverkhova, 1979^{c g}
- M. alternata Brunetti, 1912^{c g}
- M. americana Lepeletier, 1841^{g}
- M. anglica Edwards, 1925^{c g}
- M. angulata Meigen, 1818^{c g}
- M. annulata Tonnoir, 1927^{c g}
- M. annuliventris Matile, 1972^{c g}
- M. antennalis Marshall, 1896^{c g}
- M. antennata Freeman, 1951^{c g}
- M. apicalis Hoffmeister, 1844^{c g}
- M. aquabellissima Chandler, 1994^{c g}
- M. aquilonia Stackelberg, 1945^{c g}
- M. arcuata Sasakawa, 1966^{c g}
- M. armata Freeman, 1951^{c g}
- M. aterrima Stackelberg, 1945^{c g}
- M. azorica Stora, 1945^{g}
- M. basilewskyi Vanschuytbroeck, 1965^{c g}
- M. beringensis Malloch, 1923^{i g}
- M. bicolor Garrett, 1925^{i c g}
- M. bilucida Matile, 1979^{c g}
- M. bipunctata Edwards, 1925^{c g}
- M. breviceps Sasakawa, 1966^{c g}
- M. brunnea Brunetti, 1912^{c g}
- M. buskettina Chandler & Gatt, 2000^{c g}
- M. campbelli Edwards, 1927^{c g}
- M. caudata Matile, 1977^{c g}
- M. centralis Meigen, 1818^{c g}
- M. chilena Lane, 1962^{c g}
- M. clara Loew, 1869^{i c g}
- M. clavinervis Van Duzee, 1928^{i c g}
- M. comosa Ostroverkhova, 1979^{c g}
- M. concinna Williston, 1896^{c g}
- M. coxata Sasakawa, 1966^{c g}
- M. crassicornis Winnertz, 1863^{c g}
- M. critica Chandler, 2006^{c g}
- M. crozetensis Colless, 1970^{c g}
- M. cypriaca Chandler, 2006^{c g}
- M. decorosa Skuse, 1888^{c g}
- M. delicata Skuse, 1888^{c g}
- M. diluta Adams, 1903^{i c g}
- M. distincta Garrett, 1925^{i c g}
- M. districta Coher, 1988^{c g}
- M. diversimaculata Santos Abreu, 1920^{c g}
- M. edwardsi Freeman, 1970^{c g}
- M. egregia Meijere, 1924^{c g}
- M. elegans Brunetti, 1912^{c g}
- M. elegantula Coher, 1988^{c g}
- M. elgonensis Freeman, 1970^{c g}
- M. ephemeraeformis Alexander, 1924^{c g}
- M. estonica Landrock, 1924^{c g}
- M. exilis Matile, 1972^{c g}
- M. ezoensis Okada, 1937^{c g}
- M. fasciata Meigen, 1804^{c g}
- M. fascipennis Staeger, 1840^{c g}
- M. fastuosa Loew, 1869^{c g}
- M. femina Coher, 1963^{c g}
- M. fisherae Shaw, 1935^{i c g}
- M. flavescens Freeman, 1951^{c g}
- M. flavicosta Brunetti, 1912^{c g}
- M. flavithorax Freeman, 1951^{c g}
- M. flavobrunnea Freeman, 1951^{c g}
- M. flexa Ostroverkhova, 1974^{c g}
- M. floridana Johnson, 1926^{i c g}
- M. formosa Loew, 1866^{i c g}
- M. frigida Sack, 1923^{c g}
- M. fryeri Edwards, 1913^{c g}
- M. fumidapex Freeman, 1954^{c g}
- M. fumigata Tollet, 1955^{c g}
- M. funerea Freeman, 1951^{c g}
- M. fusciventris Roser, 1840^{c g}
- M. fuscoides Evenhuis, 2006^{c g}
- M. garretti Evenhuis, 2006^{c g}
- M. gemagea Bechev, 1991^{c g}
- M. geminata Johannsen, 1910^{i c g}
- M. glabrata Tonnoir, 1927^{c g}
- M. gourlayi Tonnoir, 1927^{c g}
- M. grandis Lundstroem, 1912^{c g}
- M. griveaudi Matile, 1972^{c g}
- M. guaianasi Lane, 1950^{c g}
- M. guarani Lane, 1950^{c g}
- M. hermonophila Chandler, 1994^{c g}
- M. hirsuta Loew, 1869^{i c g}
- M. hirtipennis Van Duzee, 1928^{i c g}
- M. horrida Freeman, 1951^{c g}
- M. howletti Marshall, 1896^{c g}
- M. hudsoni Tonnoir, 1927^{c g}
- M. hyalinimculata Santos Abreu, 1920^{c g}
- M. hyalipennis Shaw, 1941^{i c g}
- M. immaculata Johnson, 1902^{i c g}
- M. inaequalis Freeman, 1951^{c g}
- M. incompleta Becker, 1908^{c g}
- M. inconcinna Loew, 1869^{c g}
- M. inconspicua Brunetti, 1912^{c g}
- M. indigena Johannsen, 1910^{c g}
- M. insignis Vockeroth, 1976^{c g}
- M. interrogationis (Speiser, 1913)^{c g}
- M. inversa Loew, 1869^{c g}
- M. jonica Martinovsky, 2001^{c g}
- M. kerteszi Lundstroem, 1911^{c g}
- M. klossi Edwards, 1933^{c g}
- M. kraussi Matile, 1988^{c g}
- M. lacustrina Coher, 1988^{c g}
- M. lateralis Freeman, 1970^{c g}
- M. levantina Chandler, 1994^{c g}
- M. longibrachiata Landrock, 1917^{c g}
- M. lutea Meigen, 1804^{c g}
- M. luteobrunnea Matile, 1977^{c g}
- M. maculata Meigen, 1818^{c g}
- M. maculosa Matsumura, 1915^{c g}
- M. mastersi Skuse, 1888^{c g}
- M. matilei Papavero, 1978^{c g}
- M. microsticta Edwards, 1932^{c g}
- M. minima Matile, 1988^{c g}
- M. nana Macquart, 1826^{g}
- M. nebulosa Coquillett, 1901^{i c g}
- M. neobrunnea Wu & Yang, 1993^{c g}
- M. nepalensis Coher, 1963^{c g}
- M. nephrotoma Matile, 1972^{c g}
- M. ngaireae Edwards, 1927^{c g}
- M. nigricoxa Winnertz, 1863^{c g}
- M. nigropicea Lundstroem, 1906^{c g}
- M. nitens Edwards, 1928^{c g}
- M. nitida Freeman, 1970^{c g}
- M. nobilis Johnson, 1922^{i c g}
- M. obscura Winnertz, 1863^{c g}
- M. obsoleta Edwards, 1927^{c g}
- M. ornata Brunetti, 1912^{c g}
- M. parcehirsuta Becker, 1907^{c g}
- M. parva Lundstroem, 1914^{c g}
- M. penicillata Costa, 1857^{c g}
- M. pensylvanica Lepeletier, 1841^{g}
- M. perpictula Edwards, 1940^{c g}
- M. phalerata Meigen, 1818^{c g}
- M. philadelphica Lepeletier, 1841^{g}
- M. picta Freeman, 1951^{c g}
- M. pictipennis Matile, 1969^{c g}
- M. picturata Edwards, 1933^{c g}
- M. pilosa Garrett, 1925^{i c g}
- M. plaumanni Edwards, 1940^{c g}
- M. propleuralis Edwards, 1941^{c g}
- M. pulchra Tonnoir, 1927^{c g}
- M. pumilio Loew, 1869^{c g}
- M. puncticosta Edwards, 1934^{c g}
- M. pusilla Meigen, 1830^{g}
- M. quinquemaculata Sasakawa, 1966^{c g}
- M. renalifera Matile, 1988^{c g}
- M. ruficollis Edwards, 1927^{c g}
- M. scoparia Marshall, 1896^{c g}
- M. simbhanjangana Coher, 1963^{c g}
- M. similis Garrett, 1925^{i c g}
- M. sinaitica Chandler, 1994^{c g}
- M. smithi (Shaw, 1948)^{i c g}
- M. stigma Curtis, 1837^{c g}
- M. stigmatoides Curtis, 1837^{g}
- M. stigmoides Edwards, 1925^{c g}
- M. straatmani Matile, 1988^{c g}
- M. striatipennis Strobl, 1906^{c g}
- M. sudetica Landrock, 1924^{c g}
- M. summatis Vockeroth, 1976^{c g}
- M. suppositia Tollet, 1955^{c g}
- M. tawnia Wu, 1995^{c g}
- M. testacea Philippi, 1865^{c g}
- M. thomsoni Lynch Arribalzaga, 1882^{c g}
- M. thoracica Matile, 1977^{c g}
- M. tonnoiri Matile, 1989^{c g}
- M. trinubila Edwards, 1933^{c g}
- M. trispina Coher, 1963^{c g}
- M. trivittata Johnson, 1922^{i c g}
- M. tusca Loew, 1869^{c g}
- M. tyrrhenica Edwards, 1928^{c g}
- M. uncinata Ostroverkhova, 1979^{c g}
- M. unica Fisher, 1939^{c g}
- M. unicincata Matile, 1988^{c g}
- M. unicincta Matile, 1988^{g}
- M. unidens Edwards, 1931^{c g}
- M. unipunctata Tonnoir, 1927^{c g}
- M. uniqua Garrett, 1925^{i c g}
- M. unispina Freeman, 1970^{c g}
- M. valdiviana Philippi, 1865^{c g}
- M. variegata Ostroverkhova, 1979^{c g}
- M. variola Garrett, 1925^{c g}
- M. vespertina Matile, 1973^{c g}
- M. villosa Garrett, 1925^{i c g}
- M. vishnui Coher, 1963^{c g}
- M. vittata Meigen, 1830^{c g}
- M. vulcania Matile, 1979^{c g}
- M. wanawarica Ostroverkhova & Zaitzeva, 1979^{c g}
- M. wui Evenhuis, 2006^{c g}
- M. zetterstedti Lundstroem, 1914^{c g}
