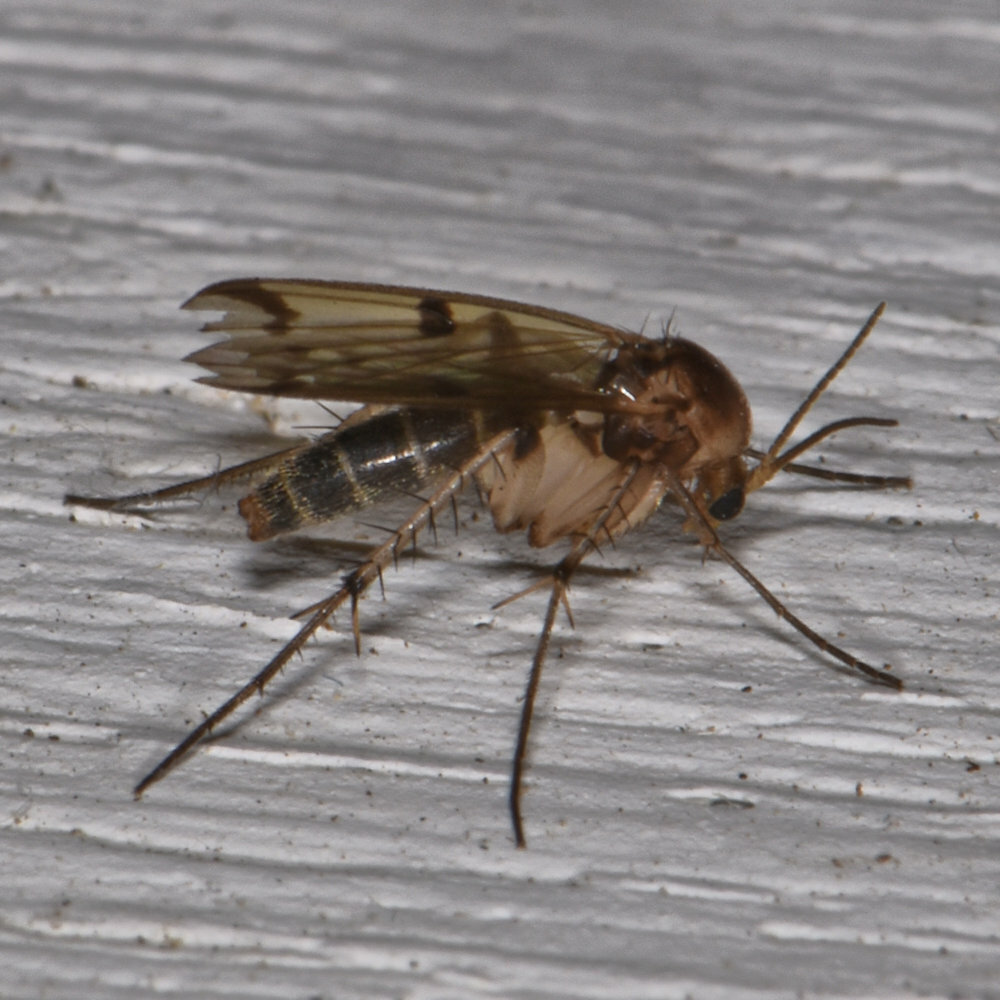

Scientific classification
- Kingdom: Animalia
- Phylum: Arthropoda
- Class: Insecta
- Order: Diptera
- Family: Mycetophilidae
- Tribe: Mycetophilini
- Genus: Mycetophila
- Species: M. sigmoides

Binomial name
- Mycetophila sigmoides Loew, 1869

Synonyms
- Mycetophila fastosa Johannsen, 1912

= Mycetophila sigmoides =

Species of fly

Mycetophila sigmoides is a species of fungus gnat in the family Mycetophilidae.
