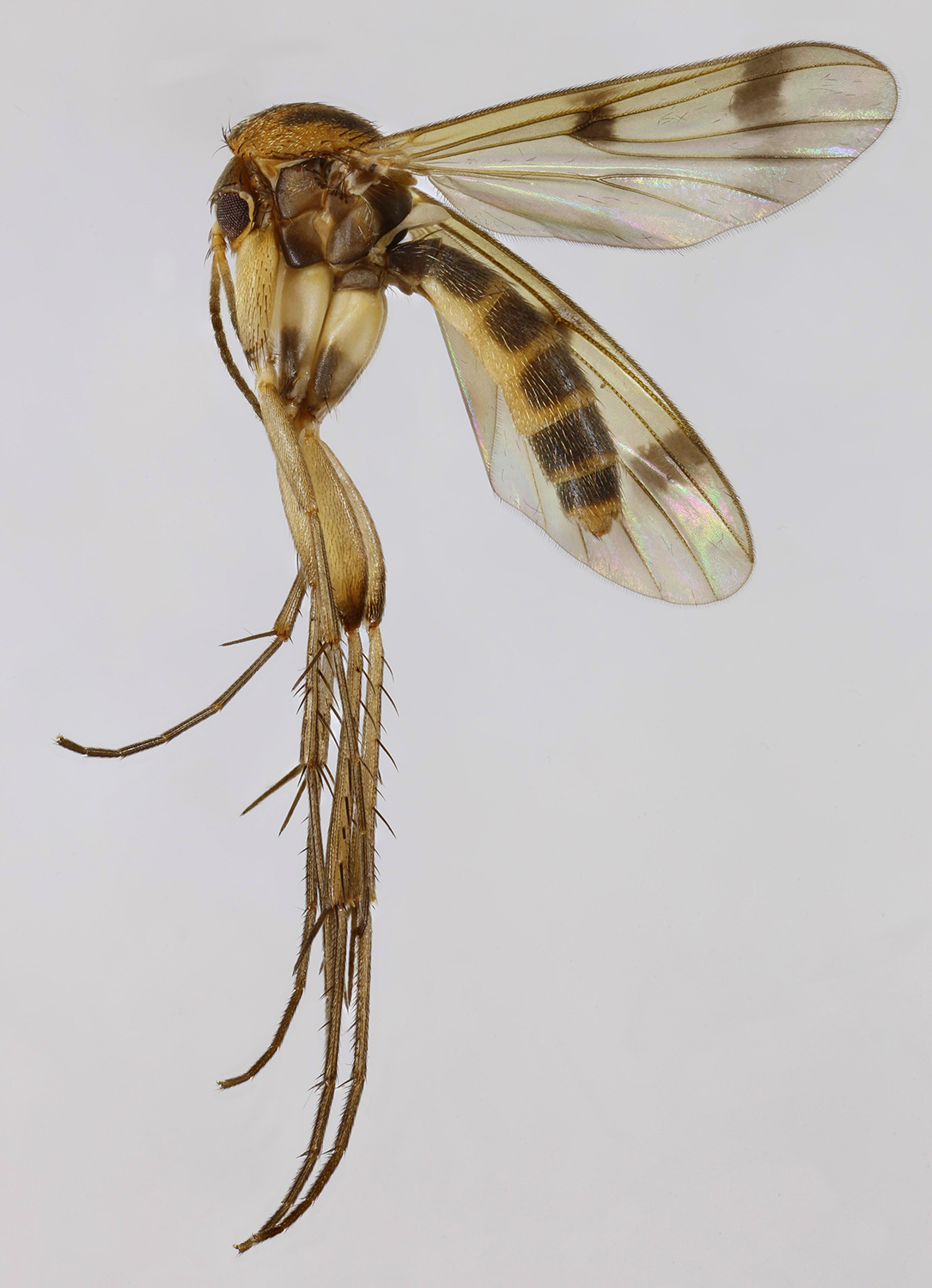
- Mycetophila formosa North Wales

Scientific classification
- Domain: Eukaryota
- Kingdom: Animalia
- Phylum: Arthropoda
- Class: Insecta
- Order: Diptera
- Family: Mycetophilidae
- Genus: Mycetophila
- Species: M. formosa

Binomial name
- Mycetophila formosa Lundstrom, 1911

= Mycetophila formosa =

Species of fly

Mycetophila formosa is a Palearctic species of 'fungus gnat' in the family Mycetophilidae. Mycetophila formosa is found in forest or wooded areas where the larvae develop in Phlebia radiata and moist, strongly decayed wood of birch and spruce log bearing Trechispora hymenocystis.

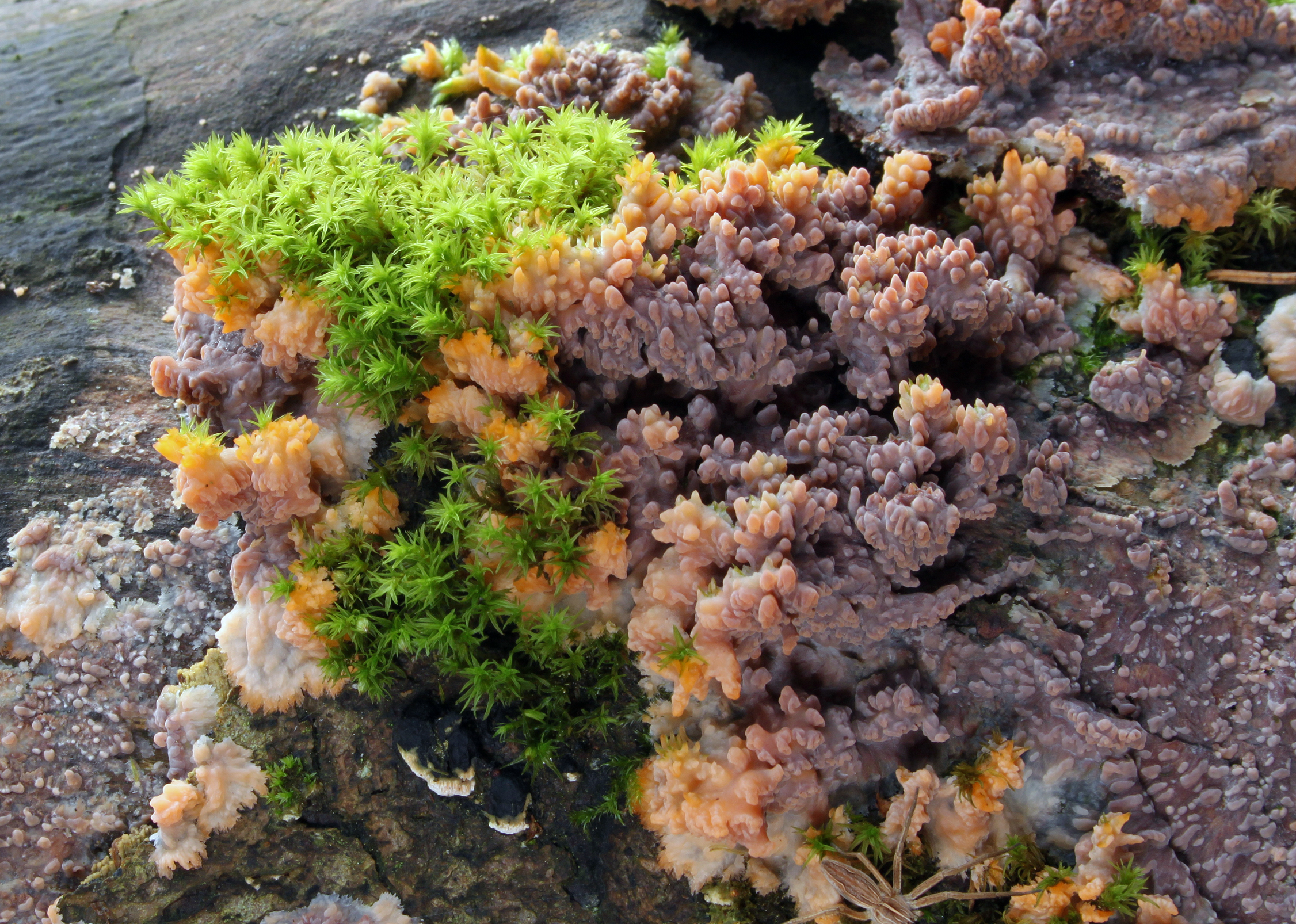
Microhabitat.Germany
