= Mycetophila elegans =

Scientific classification
- Kingdom: Animalia
- Phylum: Arthropoda
- Class: Insecta
- Order: Diptera
- Family: Mycetophilidae
- Genus: Mycetophila
- Species: M. elegans

Binomial name
- Mycetophila elegans Tonnoir, 1927

Species of fly

Mycetophila elegans is a species of 'fungus gnats' in the family Mycetophilidae.

== See also ==
- List of Mycetophila species
