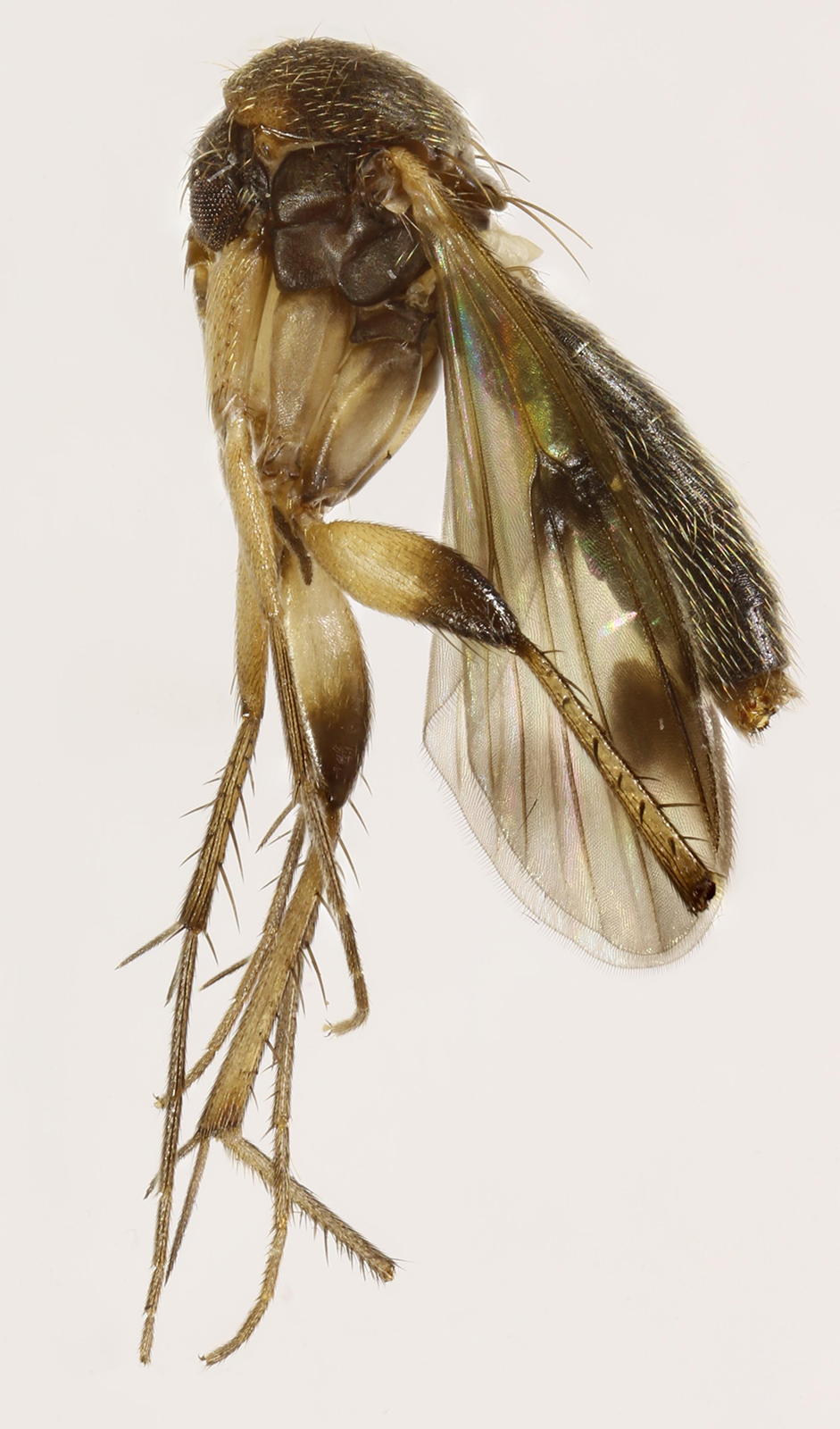
- Mycetophila edwardsi North Wales

Scientific classification
- Domain: Eukaryota
- Kingdom: Animalia
- Phylum: Arthropoda
- Class: Insecta
- Order: Diptera
- Family: Mycetophilidae
- Genus: Mycetophila
- Species: M. edwardsi

Binomial name
- Mycetophila edwardsi Lundstrom, 1913

= Mycetophila edwardsi =

Species of fly

Mycetophila edwardsi is a Palearctic species of 'fungus gnat' in the family Mycetophilidae. Mycetophila edwardsi is found in forest or wooded areas where the larvae develop in fruiting bodies of large fungi.

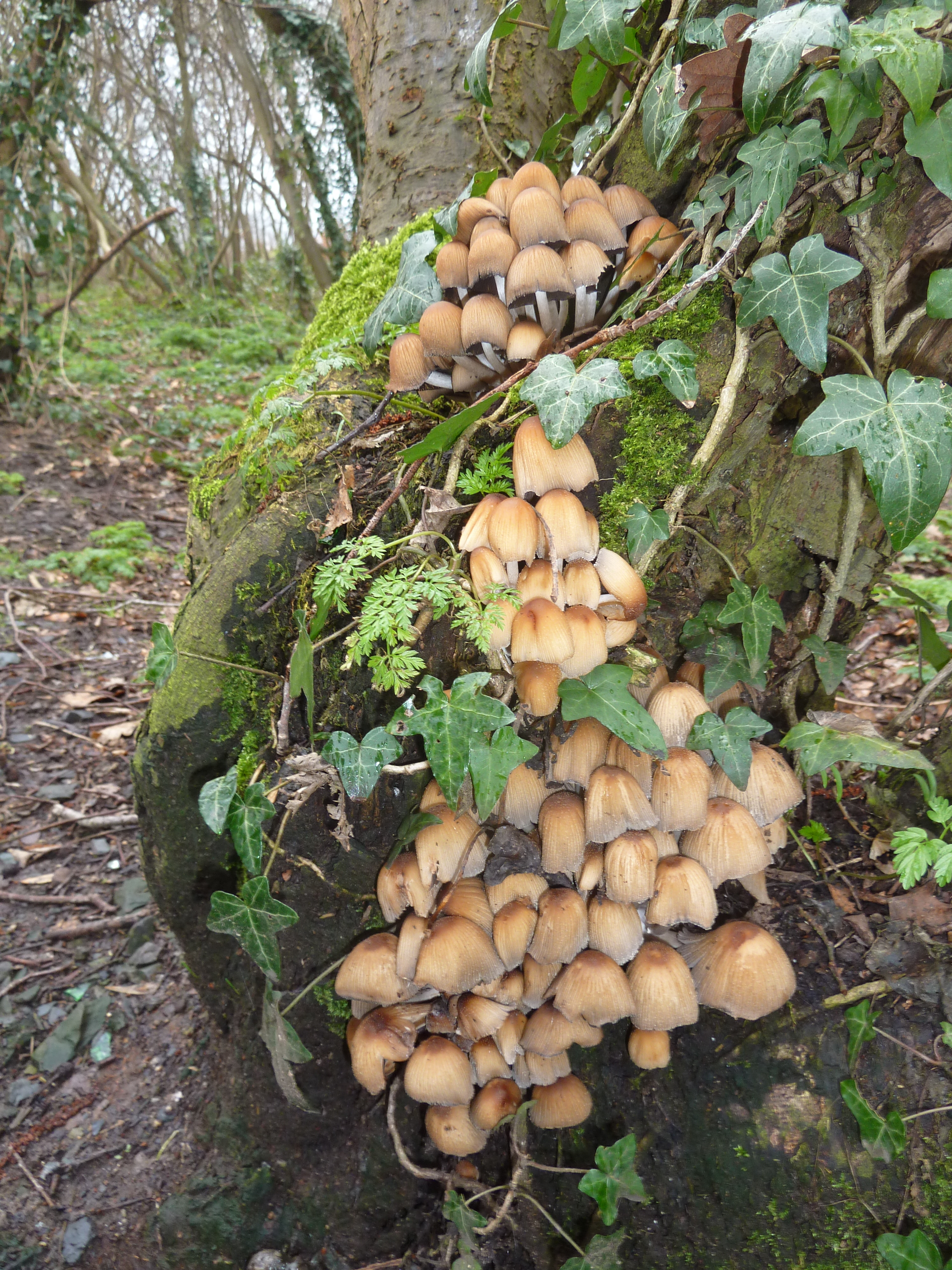
Habitat.Ireland.
