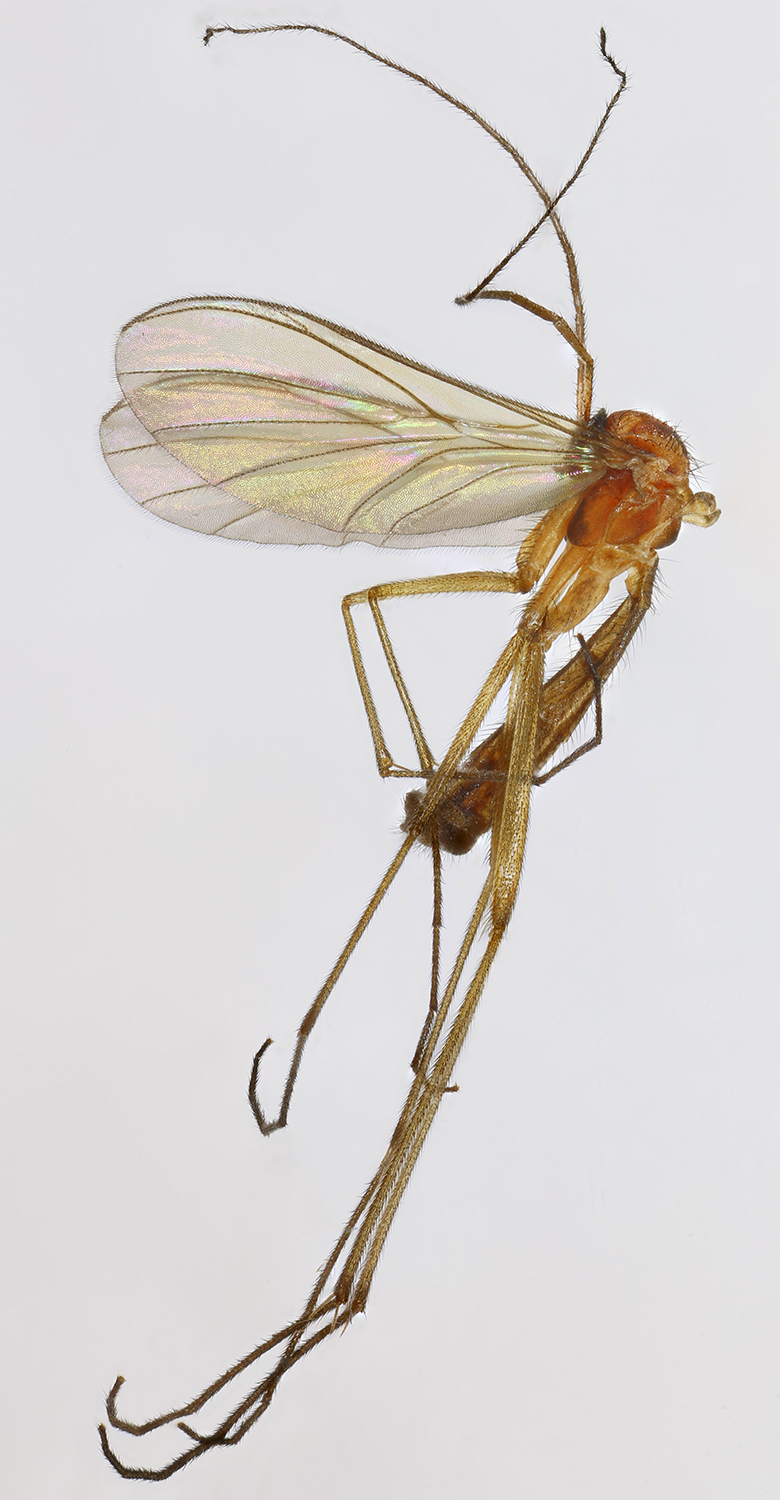
- Isoneuromyia semirufa North Wales

Scientific classification
- Kingdom: Animalia
- Phylum: Arthropoda
- Class: Insecta
- Order: Diptera
- Family: Keroplatidae
- Genus: Macrocera
- Species: M. parva

Binomial name
- Macrocera parva Lundstrom, 1914

= Macrocera parva =

Species of fly

Macrocera parva is a Palearctic species of 'fungus gnat' in the family Keroplatidae.Larvae of species in this genus have been reared from a range of situations including clumps of turf, rotting wood and cave walls and are thought to be predaceous.

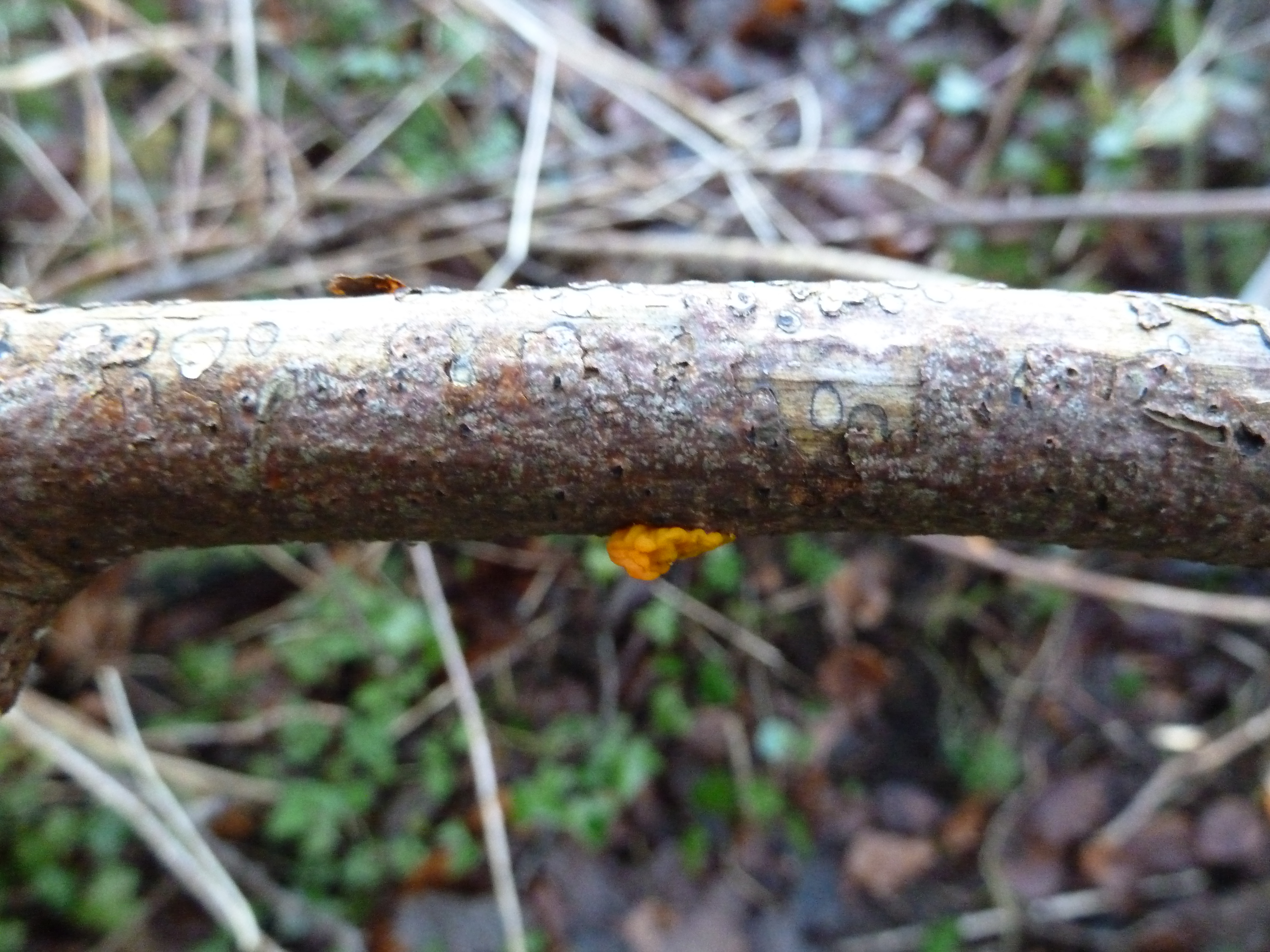
Microhabitat.Ireland.
