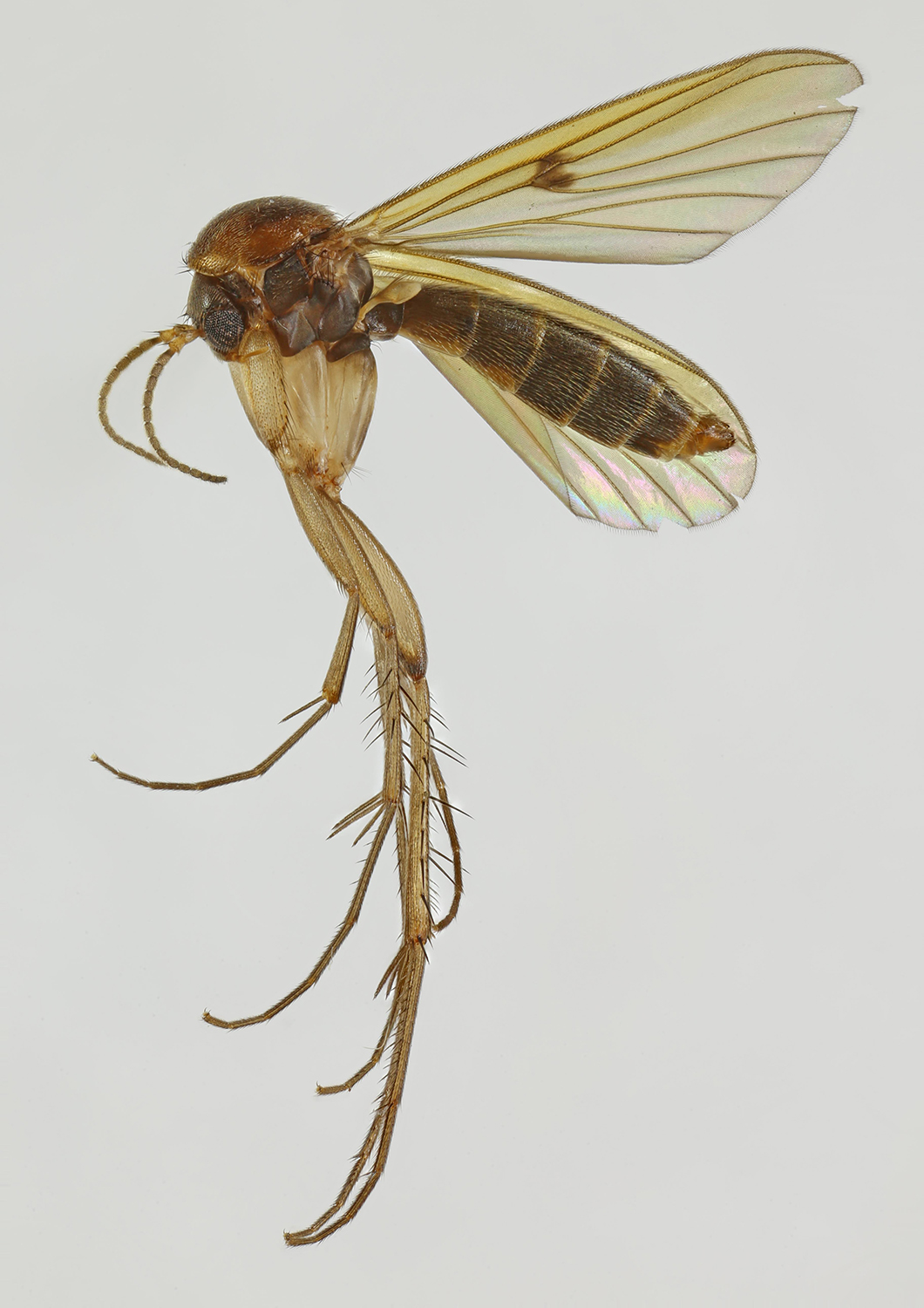

Scientific classification
- Domain: Eukaryota
- Kingdom: Animalia
- Phylum: Arthropoda
- Class: Insecta
- Order: Diptera
- Family: Mycetophilidae
- Tribe: Mycetophilini
- Genus: Mycetophila
- Species: M. unipunctata

Binomial name
- Mycetophila unipunctata Meigen, 1818

Synonyms
- Mycetophila discoida Say, 1829; Mycetophila inculta Loew, 1869

= Mycetophila unipunctata =

Species of fly

Mycetophila unipunctata is a species of fungus gnats in the family Mycetophilidae.

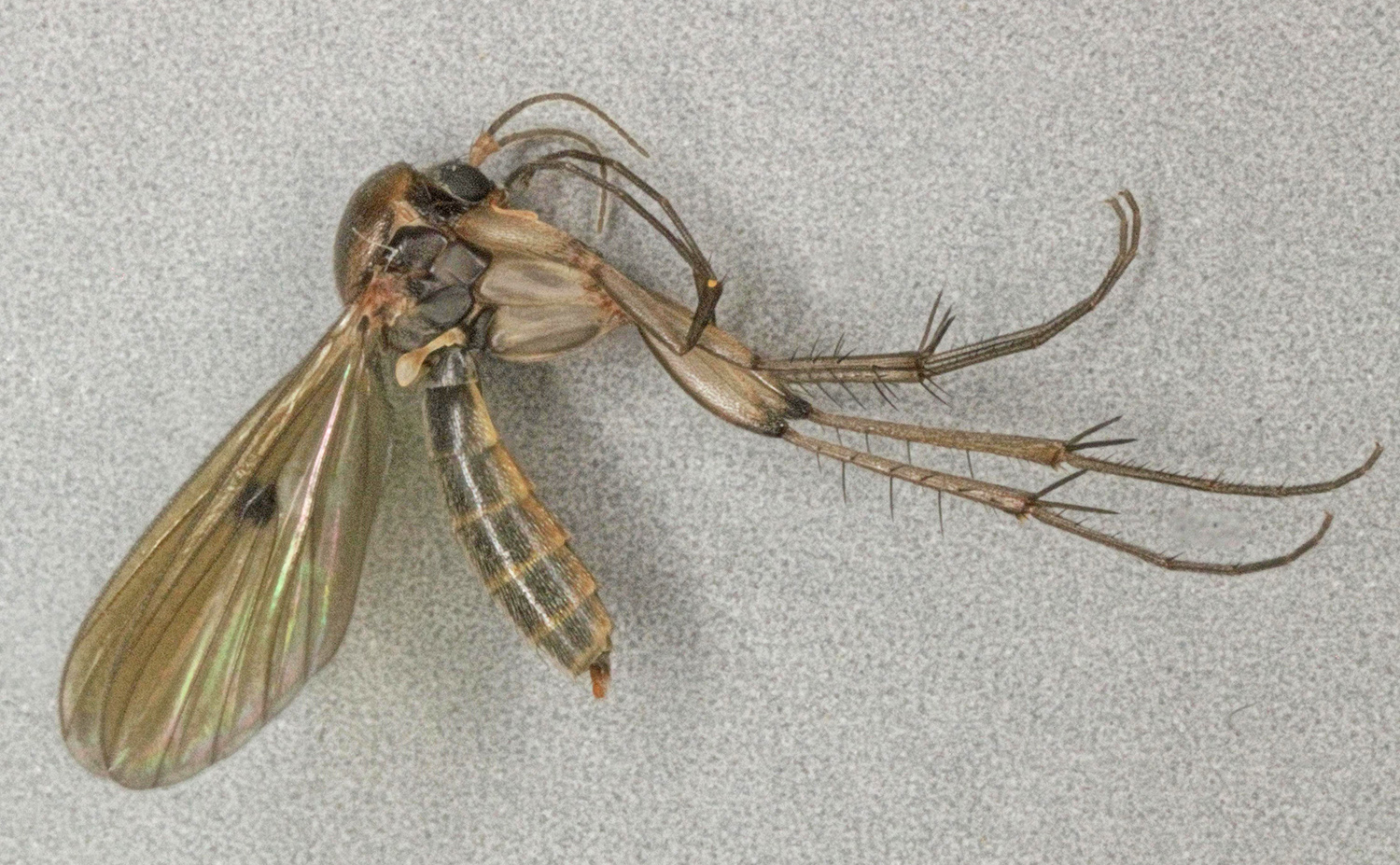
