= Mycetophila fisherae =

Scientific classification
- Domain: Eukaryota
- Kingdom: Animalia
- Phylum: Arthropoda
- Class: Insecta
- Order: Diptera
- Family: Mycetophilidae
- Tribe: Mycetophilini
- Genus: Mycetophila
- Species: M. fisherae

Binomial name
- Mycetophila fisherae (Laffoon, 1957)

Synonyms
- Fungivora fisherae Laffoon, 1957

Species of fly

Mycetophila fisherae is a species of fungus gnats in the family Mycetophilidae. The species was named after Maryland entomologist, bacteriologist, and bryologist Elizabeth Gault Fisher. It is known to emerge from Suillus fungi.
