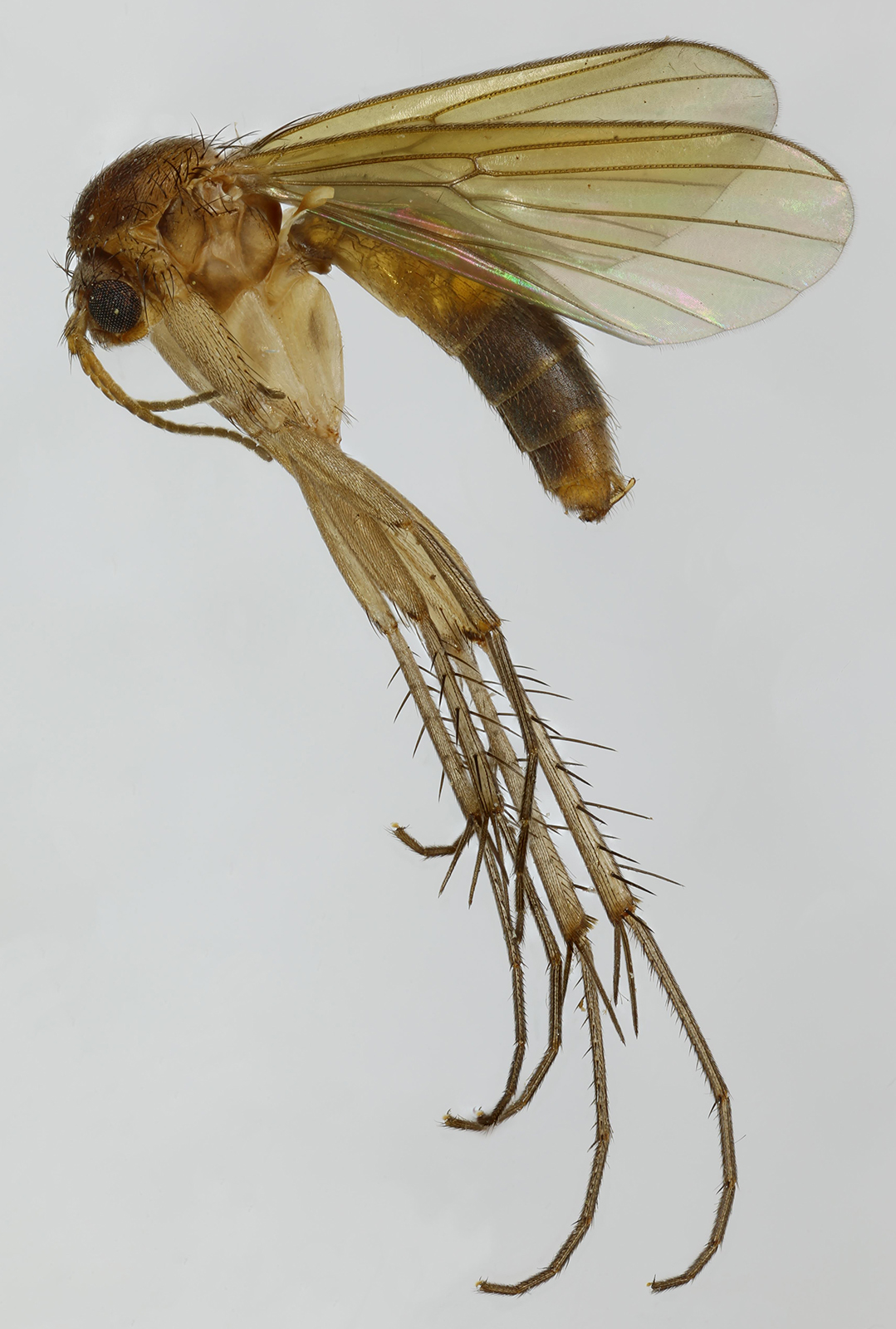
- Mycetophila fungorum North Wales

Scientific classification
- Domain: Eukaryota
- Kingdom: Animalia
- Phylum: Arthropoda
- Class: Insecta
- Order: Diptera
- Family: Mycetophilidae
- Genus: Mycetophila
- Species: M. fungorum

Binomial name
- Mycetophila fungorum (De Geer, 1776)

= Mycetophila fungorum =

Species of fly

Mycetophila fungorum is a Palearctic species of 'fungus gnats' in the family Mycetophilidae. Mycetophila fungorum is found in forest or wooded areas where the larvae develop in Agaricales and also obtained with emergence traps over dead wood, soil and ground flora.

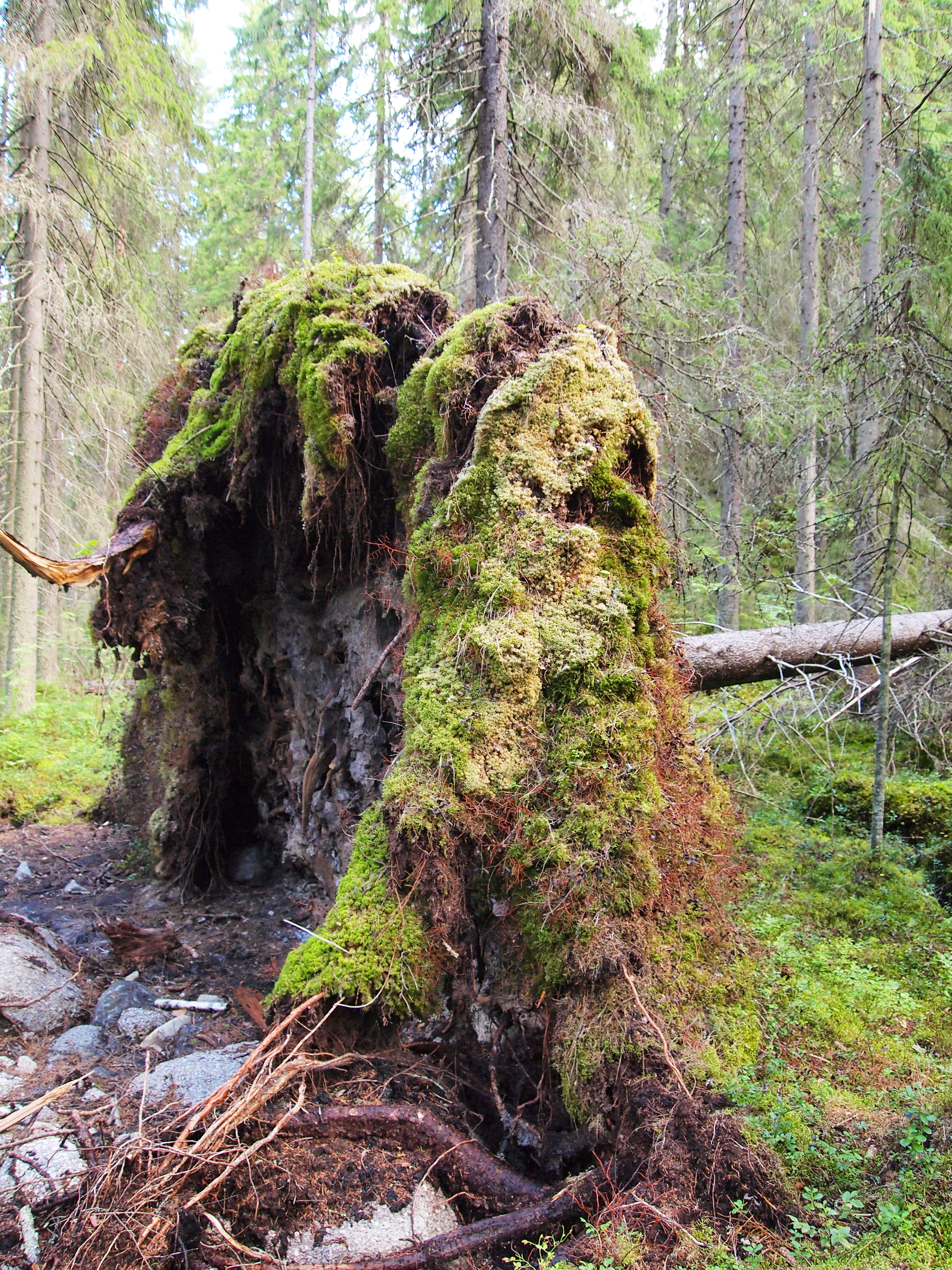
Habitat.Finland.
