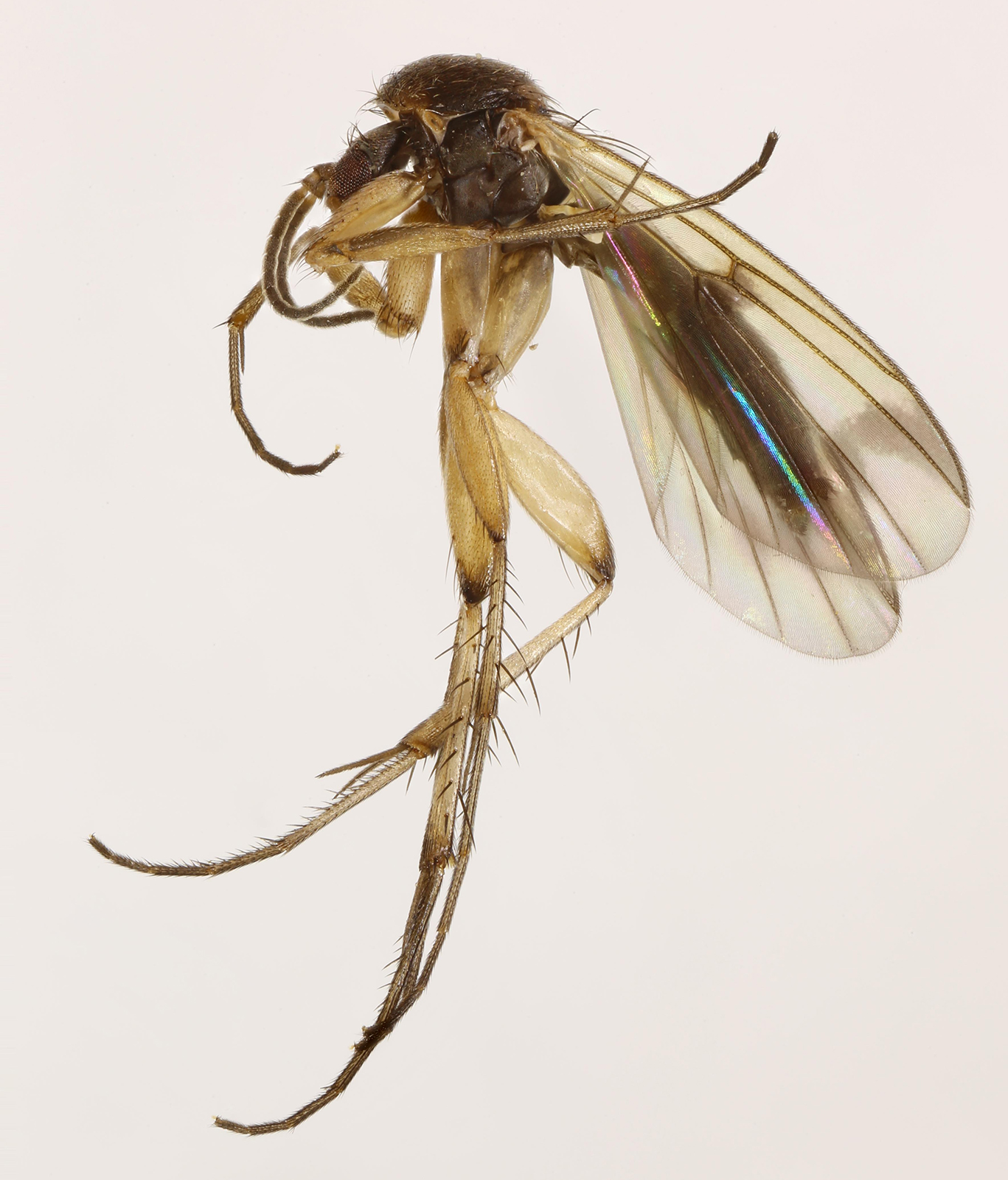
- Mycetophila luctuosa North Wales

Scientific classification
- Domain: Eukaryota
- Kingdom: Animalia
- Phylum: Arthropoda
- Class: Insecta
- Order: Diptera
- Family: Mycetophilidae
- Genus: Mycetophila
- Species: M. luctuosa

Binomial name
- Mycetophila luctuosa Meigen, 1830

= Mycetophila luctuosa =

Species of fly

Mycetophila luctuosa is a Palearctic species of 'fungus gnats' in the family Mycetophilidae. Mycetophila luctuosa is found in forest or wooded areas where the larvae develop in Neolentinus lepideus, Kretzschmaria deusta, Chondrostereum purpureum, Sebacina incrustans, Neolentinus tigrinus, Pleurotus spp., Trametes versicolor and a wide range of epigeic fungi, mostly Russulaceae.

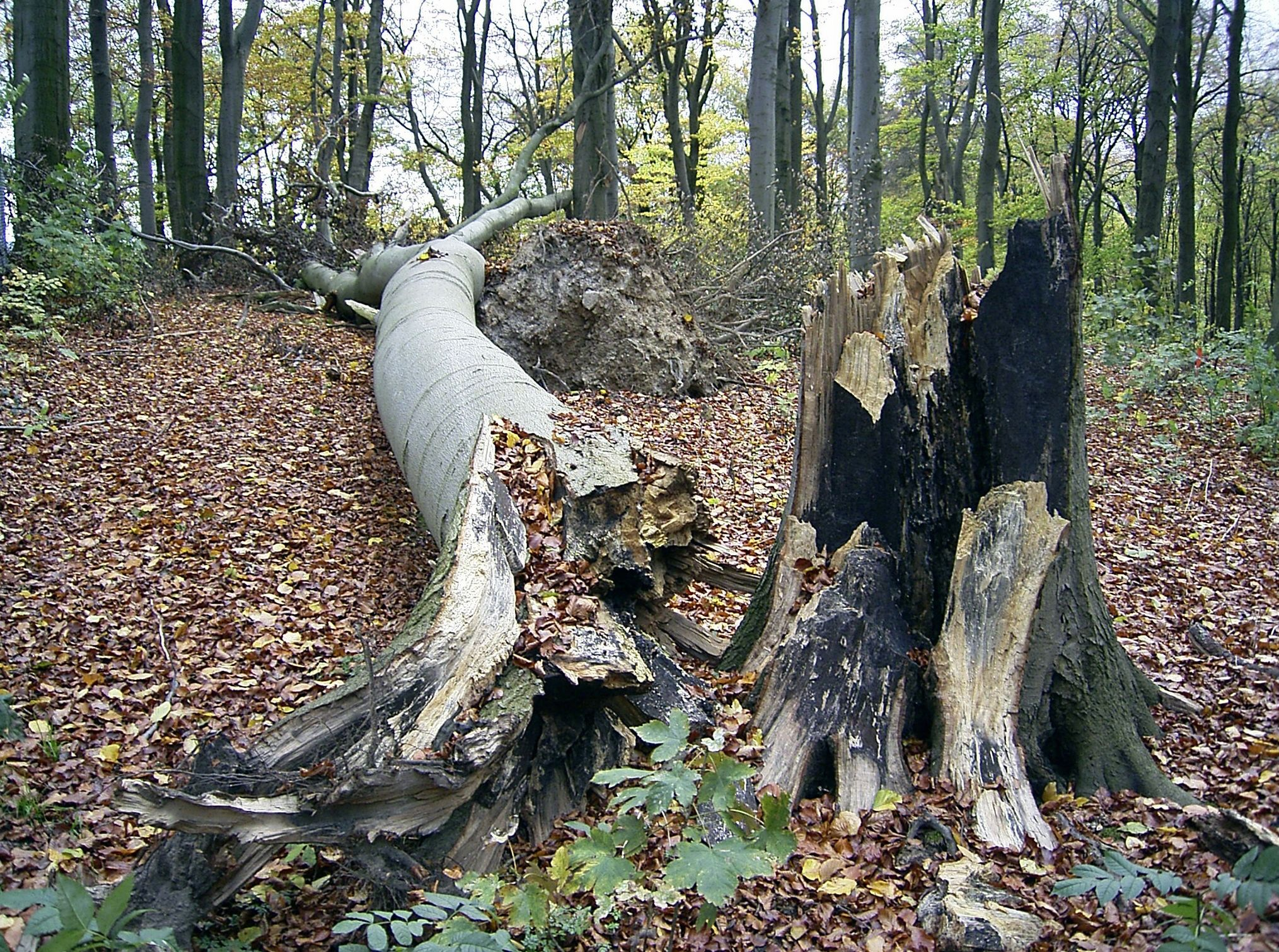
Habitat.Germany
