= Macrocera formosa =

Scientific classification
- Kingdom: Animalia
- Phylum: Arthropoda
- Clade: Pancrustacea
- Class: Insecta
- Order: Diptera
- Family: Keroplatidae
- Tribe: Macrocerini
- Genus: Macrocera
- Species: M. formosa

Binomial name
- Macrocera formosa Loew, 1866

Species of fly

Macrocera formosa is a species of predatory fungus gnat, which are insects in the family Keroplatidae.
