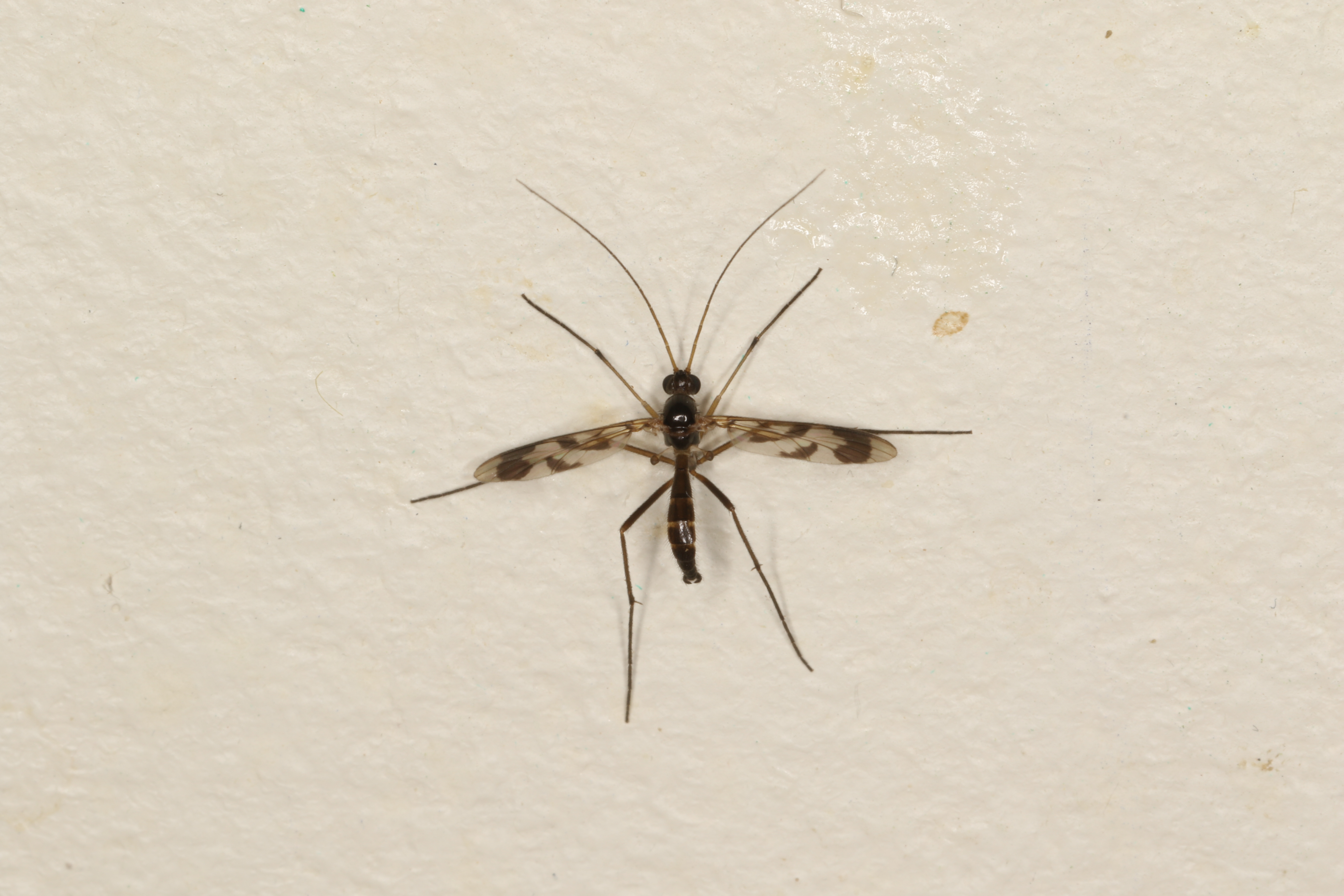
- Macrocera decorosa

Scientific classification
- Domain: Eukaryota
- Kingdom: Animalia
- Phylum: Arthropoda
- Class: Insecta
- Order: Diptera
- Family: Keroplatidae
- Subfamily: Macrocerinae
- Tribe: Macrocerini
- Genus: Macrocera; Meigen, 1803

Diversity
- at least 210 species

= Macrocera =

Genus of flies

Macrocera is a genus of predatory fungus gnats in the family Keroplatidae. There are at least 190 described species in Macrocera.

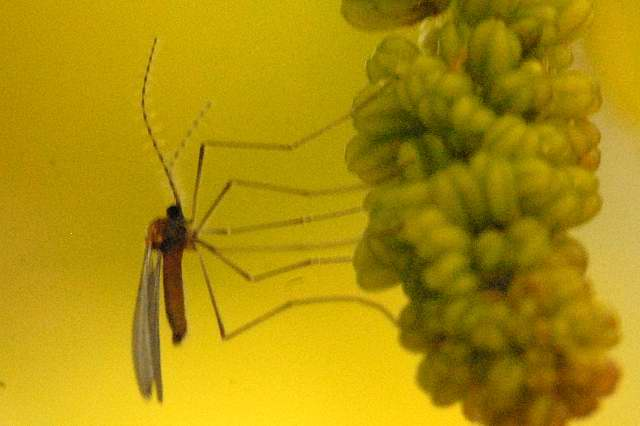
Macrocera pusilla

== See also ==
- List of Macrocera species
