= Carl August Lundström =

Finnish entomologist (1844–1914)

Carl August Lundström (1844–1914) was a Finnish entomologist who specialised in Diptera especially Nematocera. He was a Professor in Helsinki. His insect collection is held by the Finnish Museum of Natural History.

== Works ==
partial list

- Lundstrom, C. 1911. Neue oder wenig bekannte eurapäische Mycetophiliden Annales Historico-Naturales Musei Nationalis Hungarici 9: 390-419
- Lundstrom, C. 1912. Neue oder wenig bekannte europaische Mycetophilidae 11. Annales Historico-Naturales Musei Nationalis Hungarici 10: 514-522.
- Lundstrom, C. 1912. Beitrage zur Kenntnis der Dipteren Finlands. - Supplement 2. Mycetophilidae. Acta Soc. Fauna Flora Fenn. 36(1): 1-39.
- Lundstrom, C. 1914. Beitrage zur Kenntnis der Dipteren Finlands. - Supplement 3. Mycetophilidae. Acta Soc. Fauna Flora Fenn. 39(3): 1-26.
