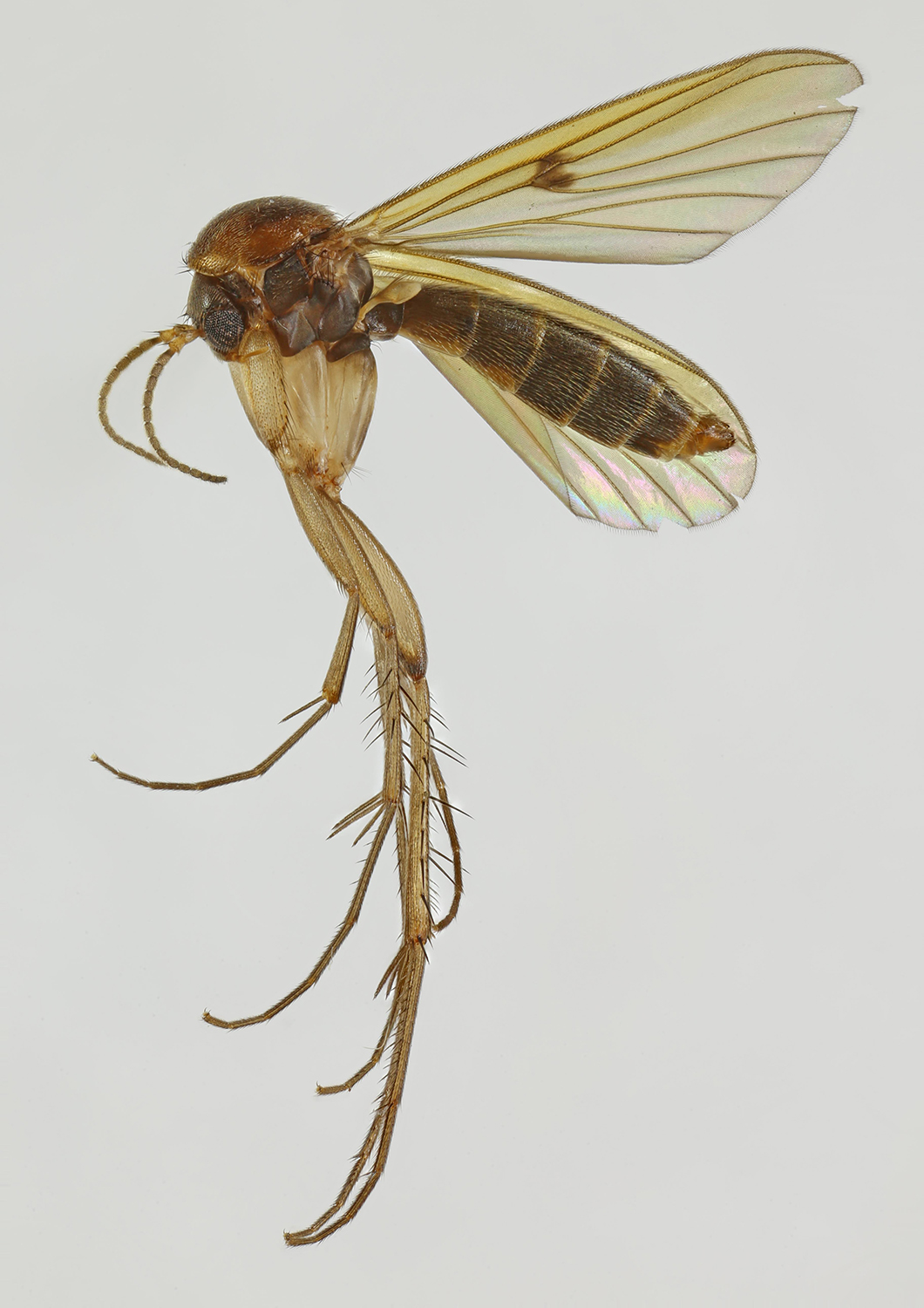
- Mycetophila unipunctata

Scientific classification
- Domain: Eukaryota
- Kingdom: Animalia
- Phylum: Arthropoda
- Class: Insecta
- Order: Diptera
- Family: Mycetophilidae
- Subfamily: Mycetophilinae
- Tribe: Mycetophilini; Newman, 1834

= Mycetophilini =

Tribe of flies

Mycetophilini is a tribe of fungus gnats in the family Mycetophilidae. There are about 8 genera and at least 220 described species in Mycetophilini.

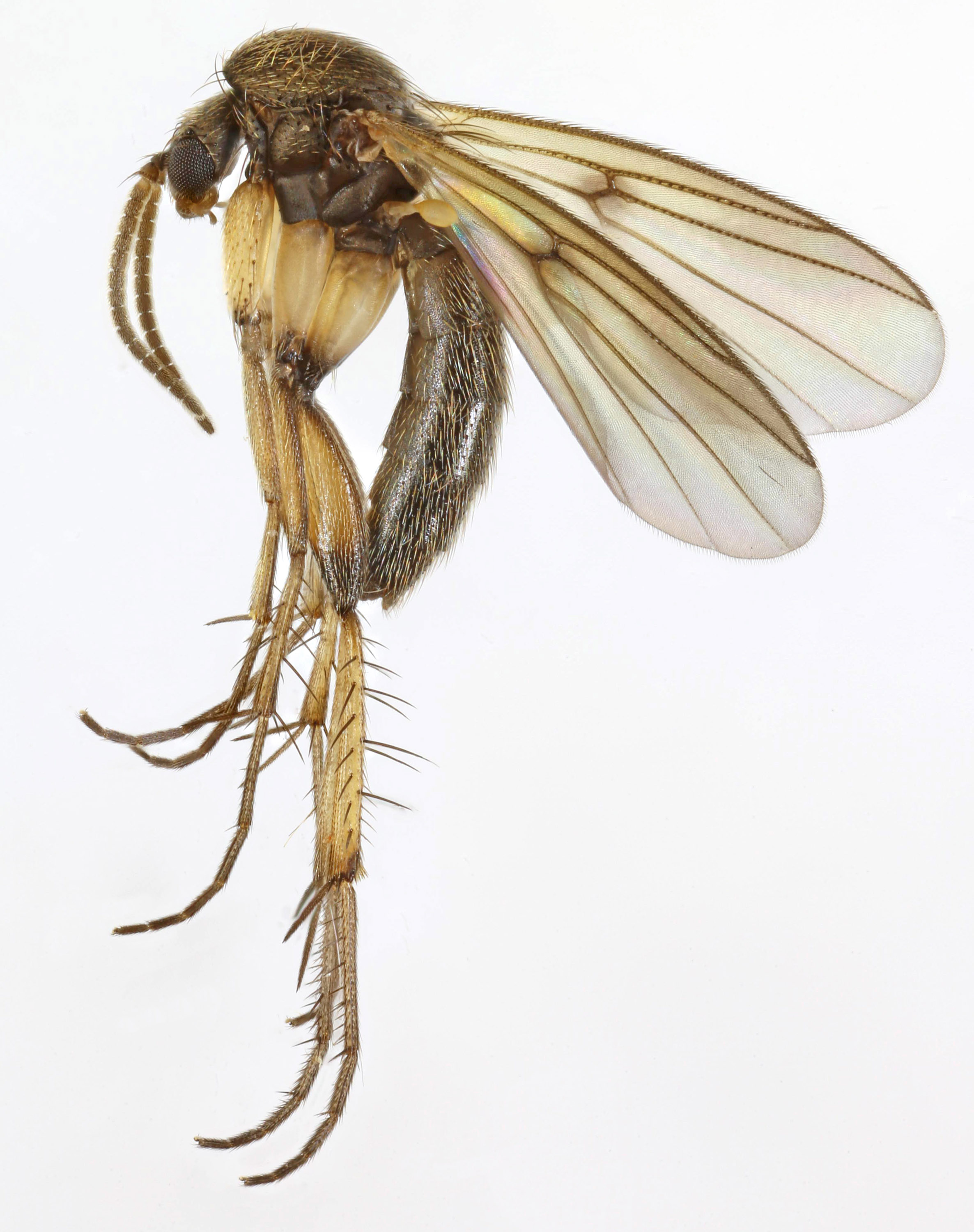
Zygomyia humeralis

== Genera ==
These eight genera belong to the tribe Mycetophilini:

- Dynatosoma^{i c g}
- Epicypta Winnertz, 1863^{i c g b}
- Macrobrachius^{i c g}
- Mycetophila^{i g b}
- Phronia Winnertz, 1863^{i c g b}
- Sceptonia Winnertz, 1863^{i g b}
- Trichonta Winnertz, 1863^{i c g b}
- Zygomyia Winnertz, 1863^{i c g b}

Data sources: i = ITIS, c = Catalogue of Life, g = GBIF, b = Bugguide.net

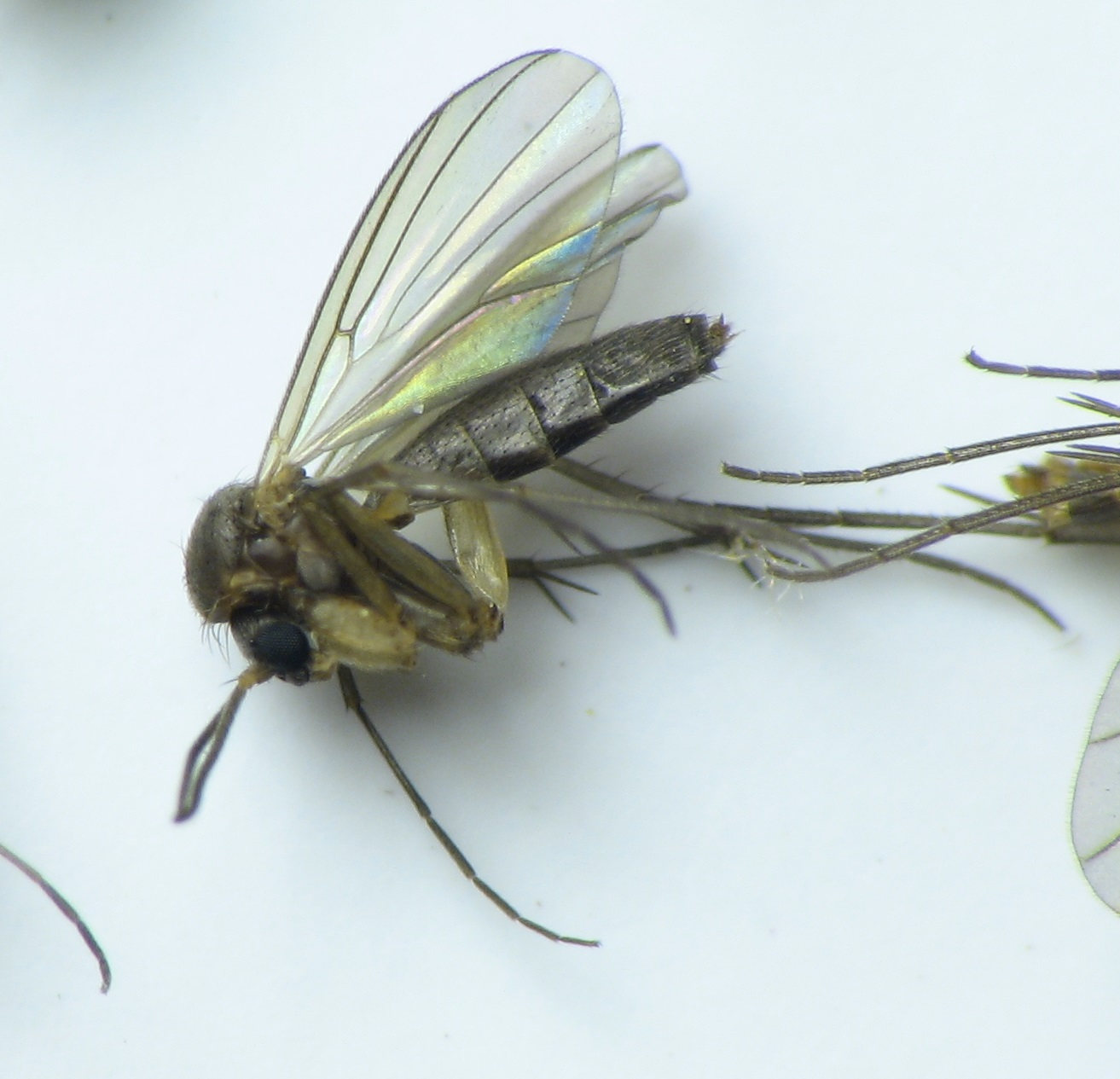
Phronia female
