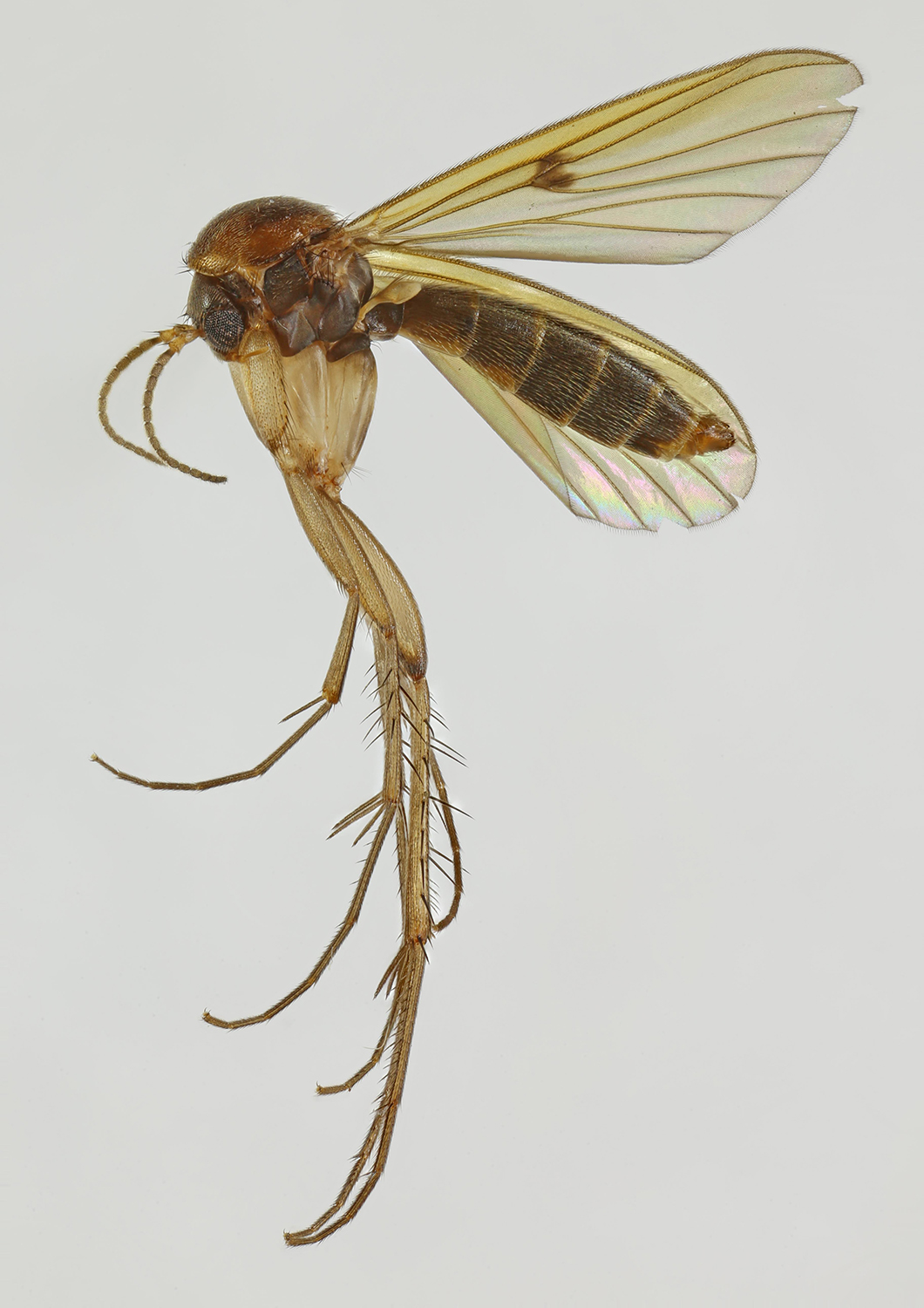
- Mycetophila unipunctata

Scientific classification
- Domain: Eukaryota
- Kingdom: Animalia
- Phylum: Arthropoda
- Class: Insecta
- Order: Diptera
- Family: Mycetophilidae
- Subfamily: Mycetophilinae
- Tribe: Mycetophilini
- Genus: Mycetophila; Meigen, 1803

Diversity
- at least 780 species

= Mycetophila =

Genus of flies

Mycetophila is a genus of fungus gnats in the family Mycetophilidae. There are at least 740 described species in Mycetophila.

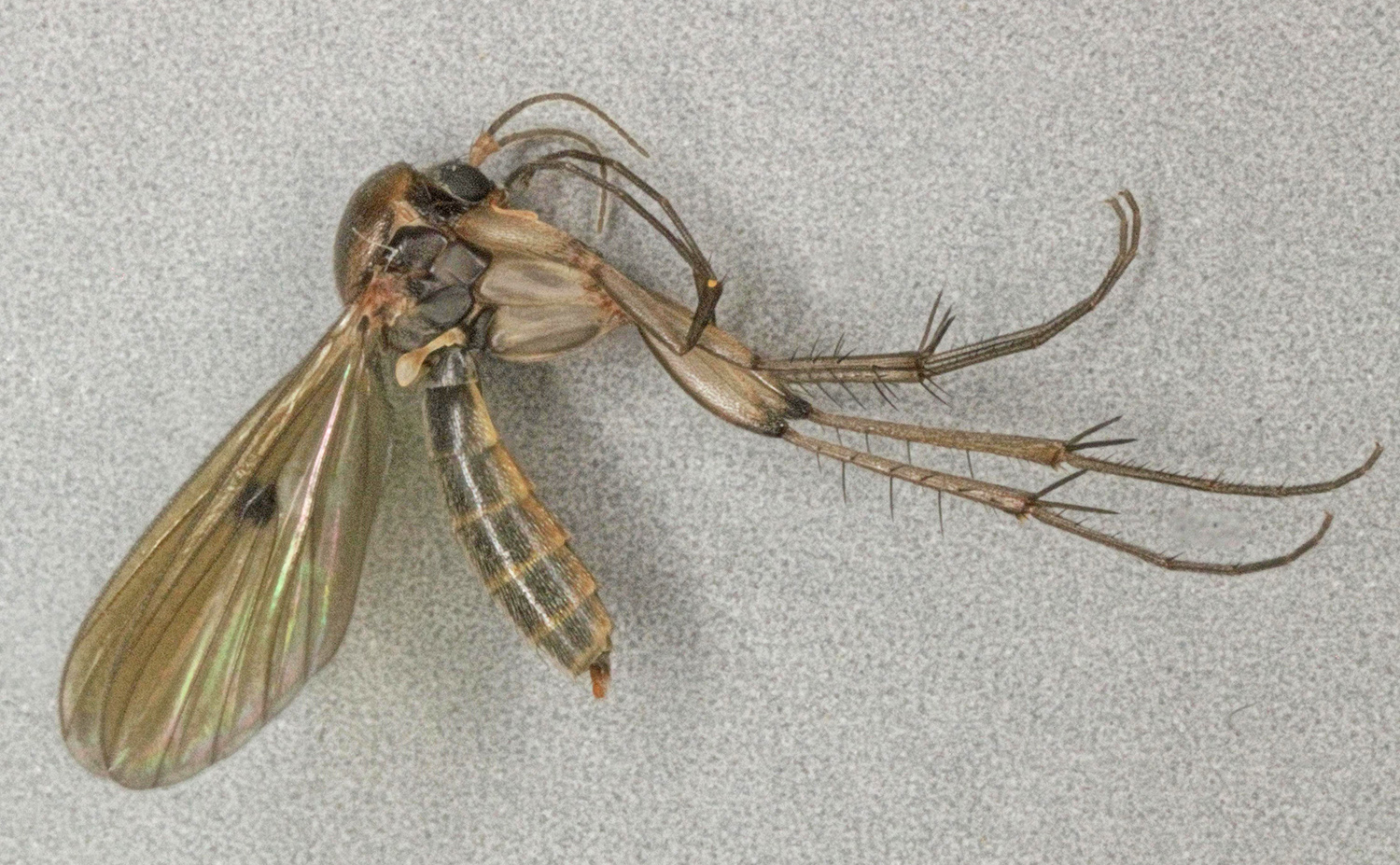
Mycetophila unipunctata

== See also ==
- List of Mycetophila species
