= List of Exechia species =

This is a list of 178 species in Exechia, a genus of fungus gnats in the family Mycetophilidae.

== Exechia species ==
- Exechia abbreviata (Skuse, 1888)^{c g}
- Exechia abrupta Johannsen, 1912^{i c g}
- Exechia absoluta Johannsen, 1912^{i c g}
- Exechia absurda Johannsen, 1912^{i c g}
- Exechia accisa Wu & Zheng, 2001^{c g}
- Exechia adamsi Laffoon, 1965^{i c g}
- Exechia adenaparva Chandler, 2000^{c g}
- Exechia aequalis Van Duzee, 1928^{i c g}
- Exechia aitkeni (Lane, 1960)^{c}
- Exechia albicincta Senior-White, 1922^{c g}
- Exechia alexanderi Shaw, 1951^{i c g}
- Exechia ampullata Senior-White, 1921^{c g}
- Exechia angustata Van Duzee, 1928^{i c g}
- Exechia areolata (Enderlein, 1910)^{c g}
- Exechia argenteofasciata Senior-White, 1921^{c g}
- Exechia arisaemae Sasakawa, 1993^{c g}
- Exechia assidua Johannsen, 1912^{i c g}
- Exechia atridonta Wu, Xu & Yu, 2004^{c g}
- Exechia attrita Johannsen, 1912^{i c g}
- Exechia auxiliaria Johannsen, 1912^{i c g}
- Exechia aviculata Shaw, 1935^{i c g}
- Exechia basilinea Brunetti, 1912^{c g}
- Exechia bella Johannsen, 1912^{i c g}
- Exechia bellula Johannsen, 1912^{i c g}
- Exechia bicincta (Staeger, 1840)^{i c g}
- Exechia bifida (Freeman, 1951)^{c g}
- Exechia bifurcata Fisher, 1934^{i c g}
- Exechia bilobata Shaw, 1951^{i c g}
- Exechia biseta Tonnoir & Edwards, 1927^{c g}
- Exechia borealis Van Duzee, 1928^{i c g}
- Exechia brevicornis Senior-White, 1922^{c g}
- Exechia brevifurcata (Freeman, 1951)^{c g}
- Exechia brevipetiolata Van Duzee, 1928^{i c g}
- Exechia brinckiana Nielsen, 1966^{c g}
- Exechia canalicula Johannsen, 1912^{i c g}
- Exechia capillata Johannsen, 1912^{i c g}
- Exechia captiva Johannsen, 1912^{i c g}
- Exechia chandleri Caspers, 1987^{c g}
- Exechia changbaiensis Wu & Zheng, 2001^{c g}
- Exechia cincinnata Johannsen, 1912^{i c g b}
- Exechia cincta Winnertz, 1863^{c g}
- Exechia cingulata (Meigen, 1830)^{c g}
- Exechia clepsydra Fisher, 1937^{i c g}
- Exechia concinna Winnertz, 1863^{c g}
- Exechia confinis Winnertz, 1863^{c g}
- Exechia contaminata Winnertz, 1863^{i c g}
- Exechia cornuta Lundstrom, 1914^{c g}
- Exechia cristata Senior-White, 1921^{c g}
- Exechia cristatoides Senior-White, 1924^{c g}
- Exechia dahli Nielsen, 1966^{c g}
- Exechia dizona Edwards, 1924^{c g}
- Exechia dorsalis (Staeger, 1840)^{c g}
- Exechia emarginata Zaitzev, 1988^{c g}
- Exechia exigua Lundstrom, 1909^{c g}
- Exechia extensa (Freeman, 1951)^{c g}
- Exechia fascipennis (Skuse, 1890)^{c g}
- Exechia festiva Winnertz, 1863^{c g}
- Exechia filata Tonnoir & Edwards, 1927^{c g}
- Exechia flabellipennis (Enderlein, 1910)^{c g}
- Exechia flava Senior-White, 1922^{c g}
- Exechia frigida (Boheman, 1865)^{i c g}
- Exechia fulva Santos Abreu, 1920^{c g}
- Exechia fumosa (Skuse, 1888)^{c g}
- Exechia funerea (Freeman, 1951)^{c g}
- Exechia furcilla (Freeman, 1954)^{c g}
- Exechia fusca (Meigen, 1804)^{i c g}
- Exechia goianensis (Lane, 1947)^{c}
- Exechia gracile (Kertesz, 1901)^{c g}
- Exechia gracilis Bukowski, 1949^{c g}
- Exechia hebetata Wu, Xu & Yu, 2004^{c g}
- Exechia hei Wu, Xu & Yu, 2004^{c g}
- Exechia hiemalis (Marshall, 1896)^{c g}
- Exechia howesi Tonnoir & Edwards, 1927^{c g}
- Exechia inaperta Ostroverkhova, 1979^{c g}
- Exechia insularis Sasakawa, 1992^{c g}
- Exechia intermedia Santos Abreu, 1920^{c g}
- Exechia kunashirensis Zaitzev, 1996^{c g}
- Exechia longichaeta Wu, Xu & Yu, 2004^{c g}
- Exechia longicornisma Senior-White, 1922^{c g}
- Exechia lucidula (Zetterstedt, 1838)^{c g}
- Exechia lundstroemi Landrock, 1923^{i c g}
- Exechia lutacea Edwards, 1928^{c g}
- Exechia lydiae Matile, 1979^{c g}
- Exechia macrura Strobl, 1910^{c g}
- Exechia macula Chandler, 2001^{c g}
- Exechia maculipennis (Stannius, 1831)^{c g}
- Exechia mastigura Edwards, 1928^{c g}
- Exechia melasa Wu & Zheng, 2001^{c g}
- Exechia micans Lastrovak & Matile, 1974^{c g}
- Exechia mirastoma Senior-White, 1922^{c g}
- Exechia nativa Johannsen, 1912^{i c g}
- Exechia nexa Johannsen, 1912^{i c g}
- Exechia nigra Edwards, 1925^{c g}
- Exechia nigrofusca Lundstrom, 1909^{c g}
- Exechia nigroscutellata Landrock, 1912^{c g}
- Exechia nitidicollis Lundstrom, 1913^{i c g}
- Exechia noctivaga Van Duzee, 1928^{i c g}
- Exechia novaezelandiae Tonnoir & Edwards, 1927^{c g}
- Exechia nugatoria Johannsen, 1912^{i c g}
- Exechia obediens Johannsen, 1912^{i c g}
- Exechia pallidula Edwards, 1926^{c g}
- Exechia palmata Johannsen, 1912^{i c g}
- Exechia papyracea Stackelberg, 1948^{c g}
- Exechia paramirastoma Senior-White, 1922^{c g}
- Exechia pararepanda Kallweit, 1995^{c g}
- Exechia parava Lundstrom, 1909^{c g}
- Exechia parva Lundström, 1909^{g}
- Exechia parvula (Zetterstedt, 1852)^{c g}
- Exechia paulistensis (Lane, 1947)^{c}
- Exechia pavani Tollet, 1959^{c g}
- Exechia pectinata Ostroverkhova, 1979^{c g}
- Exechia pectinivalva Stackelberg, 1948^{c g}
- Exechia pedekiboana Lindner, 1958^{c g}
- Exechia perspicua Johannsen, 1912^{i}
- Exechia peyerimhoffi Burghele, 1966^{c g}
- Exechia pictiventris (Skuse, 1888)^{c g}
- Exechia pilifera Matile, 1979^{c g}
- Exechia plebeia (Walker, 1848)^{i c g}
- Exechia pollex Shaw, 1935^{i c g}
- Exechia praedita Plassmann, 1976^{c g}
- Exechia pratti Shaw, 1951^{i c g}
- Exechia pseudocincta Strobl, 1910^{c g}
- Exechia pseudocontaminata Santos Abreu, 1920^{c g}
- Exechia pseudofestiva Lackschewitz, 1937^{c g}
- Exechia pulchrigaster Santos Abreu, 1920^{c g}
- Exechia pullata Ostroverkhova, 1979^{c g}
- Exechia pullicauda (Skuse, 1888)^{c g}
- Exechia quadrata Johannsen, 1912^{i c g}
- Exechia quadriclema Wu & Zheng, 2001^{c g}
- Exechia repanda Johannsen, 1912^{i c g}
- Exechia repandoides Caspers, 1984^{c g}
- Exechia rohdendorfi Zaitzev, 1996^{c g}
- Exechia rubella Santos Abreu, 1920^{c g}
- Exechia rufithorax Wulp, 1874^{c g}
- Exechia satiata Johannsen, 1912^{i c g}
- Exechia scalprifer Edwards, 1928^{c g}
- Exechia seducta Plassmann, 1976^{c g}
- Exechia semifumata (Brunetti, 1912)^{c g}
- Exechia separata Lundstrom, 1912^{c g}
- Exechia seriata (Meigen, 1830)^{c g}
- Exechia serrata Winnertz, 1863^{c g}
- Exechia setigera (Freeman, 1951)^{c g}
- Exechia setosa Matile, 1979^{c g}
- Exechia shawi Fisher, 1934^{i c g}
- Exechia shitiakevora Okada, 1939^{c g}
- Exechia sibirica Ostroverkhova, 1979^{c g}
- Exechia similis Lastovka & Matile, 1974^{c g}
- Exechia simplex (Brunetti, 1912)^{c g}
- Exechia snyderi Colless, 1966^{c g}
- Exechia solii Zaitzev, 1999^{c g}
- Exechia sororcula Lackschewitz, 1937^{c g}
- Exechia speciosa Winnertz, 1863^{c g}
- Exechia spinadhalae Chandler, 2000^{c g}
- Exechia spinigera Winnertz, 1863^{c g}
- Exechia spinuligera Lundstrom, 1912^{c g}
- Exechia styriaca Strobl, 1898^{c g}
- Exechia subcornuta Zaitzev, 1996^{c g}
- Exechia subfrigida Lastovka & Matile, 1974^{c g}
- Exechia subligulata Shaw, 1952^{i c g}
- Exechia subspinigera Zaitzev, 1988^{c g}
- Exechia subvenosa (Enderlein, 1910)^{c g}
- Exechia tajimaensis Okada, 1940^{c g}
- Exechia tenuimaculata Santos Abreu, 1920^{c g}
- Exechia thomsoni Miller, 1918^{c g}
- Exechia tomosa Wu & Zheng, 2001^{c g}
- Exechia tricincta (Enderlein, 1910)^{c g}
- Exechia triseta Ostroverkhova, 1979^{c g}
- Exechia trispinosa Zaitzev, 1996^{c g}
- Exechia truncata (Freeman, 1951)^{c}
- Exechia turkmenica Zaitzev, 1994^{c g}
- Exechia umbratica (Aldrich, 1897)^{i c g}
- Exechia umbrosa Van Duzee, 1928^{i c g}
- Exechia unicincta Van Duzee, 1928^{i c g}
- Exechia unicolor Van Duzee, 1928^{i c g}
- Exechia unifasciata Lackschewitz, 1937^{c g}
- Exechia unimaculata (Zetterstedt, 1860)^{c g}
- Exechia ussuriensis Zaitzev, 1994^{c g}
- Exechia zeylanica Senior-White, 1921^{c g}

Data sources: i = ITIS, c = Catalogue of Life, g = GBIF, b = Bugguide.net
