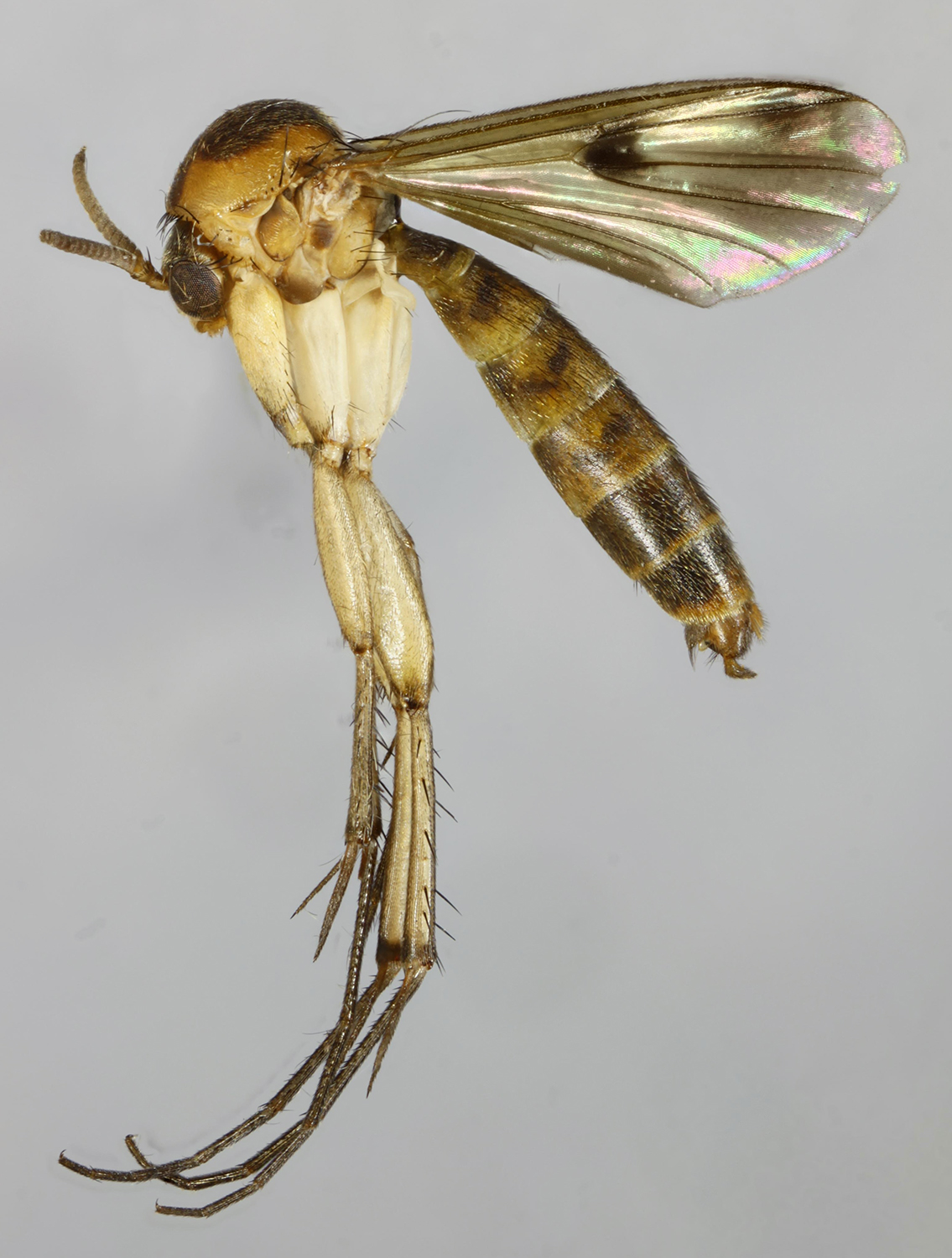
- Brachypeza bisignata North Wales

Scientific classification
- Kingdom: Animalia
- Phylum: Arthropoda
- Class: Insecta
- Order: Diptera
- Family: Mycetophilidae
- Genus: Brachypeza
- Species: B. bisignata

Binomial name
- Brachypeza bisignata Winnertz, 1863

= Brachypeza bisignata =

Species of fly

Brachypeza bisignata is a Palearctic species of 'fungus gnat' in the family Mycetophilidae. Reared from puffballs (Lycoperdales).
