= Cordyla (disambiguation) =

Cordyla can refer to the following:

- Cordyla, a genus of legumes
- Cordyla, a synonym of the orchid genus Nervilia, as described by Blume
- Cordyla (fly), a genus of fungus gnat
