= Exechia cincinnata =

Scientific classification
- Domain: Eukaryota
- Kingdom: Animalia
- Phylum: Arthropoda
- Class: Insecta
- Order: Diptera
- Family: Mycetophilidae
- Tribe: Exechiini
- Genus: Exechia
- Species: E. cincinnata

Binomial name
- Exechia cincinnata Johannsen, 1912

Species of fly

Exechia cincinnata is a species of fungus gnats in the family Mycetophilidae.
