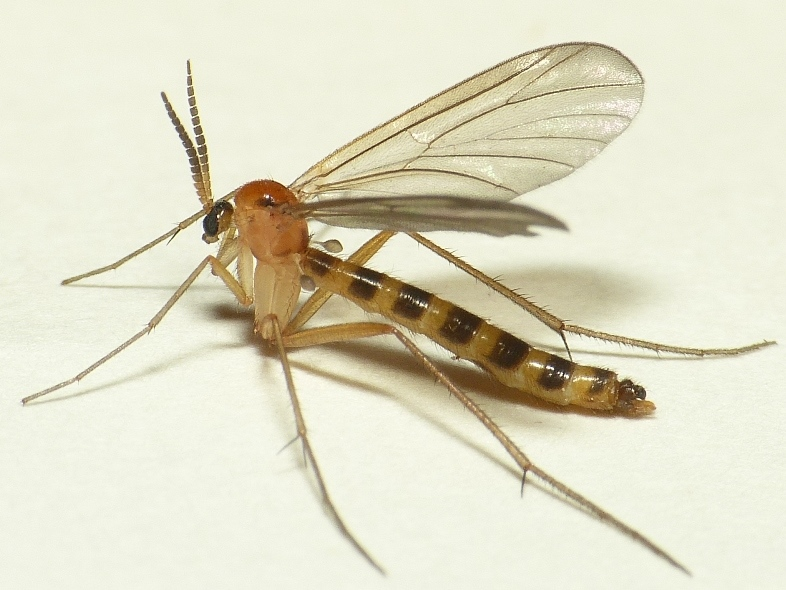

Scientific classification
- Kingdom: Animalia
- Phylum: Arthropoda
- Class: Insecta
- Order: Diptera
- Family: Ditomyiidae
- Genus: Symmerus
- Species: S. annulatus

Binomial name
- Symmerus annulatus (Meigen, 1830)

Synonyms
- Hebopteryx fasciata Stæger, 1840; Ceroplatus flavus Zetterstedt, 1850; Ceroplatus flavus Zetterstedt, 1851; Ditomyia pallida Giglio-Tos, 1890; Ditomyia vittata Walker, 1856; Plesiastina apicalis Winnertz, 1852; Symmerus ferrugineus Walker, 1848; Symmerus elongatus Saigusa, 1973

= Symmerus annulatus =

Species of fly

Symmerus annulatus is a species of fly in the family Ditomyiidae. It is found in the Palearctic.
