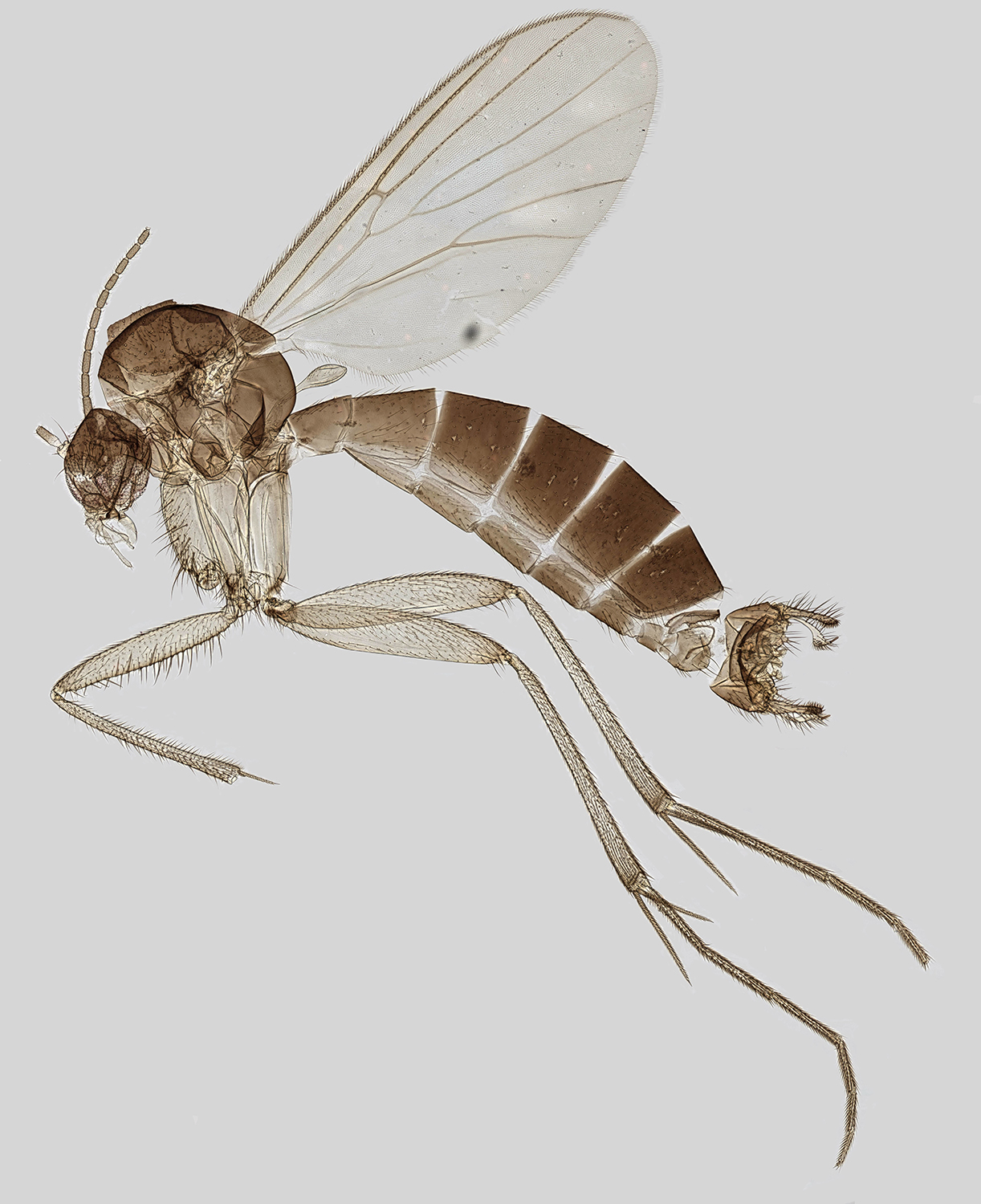
- Anatella ciliata

Scientific classification
- Domain: Eukaryota
- Kingdom: Animalia
- Phylum: Arthropoda
- Class: Insecta
- Order: Diptera
- Family: Mycetophilidae
- Tribe: Exechiini
- Genus: Anatella; Winnertz, 1863

= Anatella =

Genus of flies

Anatella is a genus of flies belonging to the family Mycetophilidae.

The genus was first described by Johannes Winnertz in 1863.

The species of this genus are found in Eurasia and Northern America.

Species:

- Anatella affinis Fisher, 1938
- Anatella alpina Plassmann, 1977
- Anatella altaica Zaitzev, 1989
- Anatella aquila Zaitzev, 1989
- Anatella arnaudi Zaitzev, 2000
- Anatella atlanticiliata Chandler & Ribeiro, 1995
- Anatella bremia Chandler, 1994
- Anatella brevifurca Strobl, 1901
- Anatella ciliata Winnertz, 1863
- Anatella clavata Ostroverkhova, 1979
- Anatella coheri Wu & Yang, 1995
- Anatella concava Plassmann, 1990
- Anatella crispa Zaitzev, 1994
- Anatella damfi Landrock, 1924
- Anatella dentata Zaitzev, 1989
- Anatella difficilis Garrett, 1925
- Anatella digitata Zaitzev, 1989
- Anatella dissecta Ostroverkhova, 1979
- Anatella emergens Caspers, 1987
- Anatella flavicauda Winnertz, 1863
- Anatella flavomaculata Edwards, 1925
- Anatella fungina Plassmann, 1984
- Anatella gibba Winnertz, 1863
- Anatella laffooni Plassmann, 1977
- Anatella latilobata Zaitzev, 1989
- Anatella lenis Dziedzicki, 1923
- Anatella longiflagellata Caspers, 1991
- Anatella longisetosa Dziedzicki, 1923
- Anatella maritima Ostroverkhova, 1979
- Anatella mendosa Zaitzev, 2000
- Anatella minutissima Ostroverkhova, 1979
- Anatella nigriclava Strobl, 1895
- Anatella novata Dziedzicki, 1923
- Anatella orbiculata Ostroverkhova & Izotov, 1974
- Anatella pseudogibba Plassmann, 1977
- Anatella ramificata Zaitzev, 1989
- Anatella rufithorax Strobl, 1895
- Anatella scalaria Ostroverkhova, 1979
- Anatella schmitzi Landrock, 1925
- Anatella setigera Edwards, 1921
- Anatella silvestris Johannsen, 1909
- Anatella simpatica Dziedzicki, 1923
- Anatella stimulea Plassmann, 1977
- Anatella subulata Zaitzev, 1994
- Anatella tungusica Ostroverkhova, 1979
- Anatella turi Dziedzicki, 1923
- Anatella umbraculiforma Ostroverkhova, 1974
- Anatella unguigera Edwards, 1921
