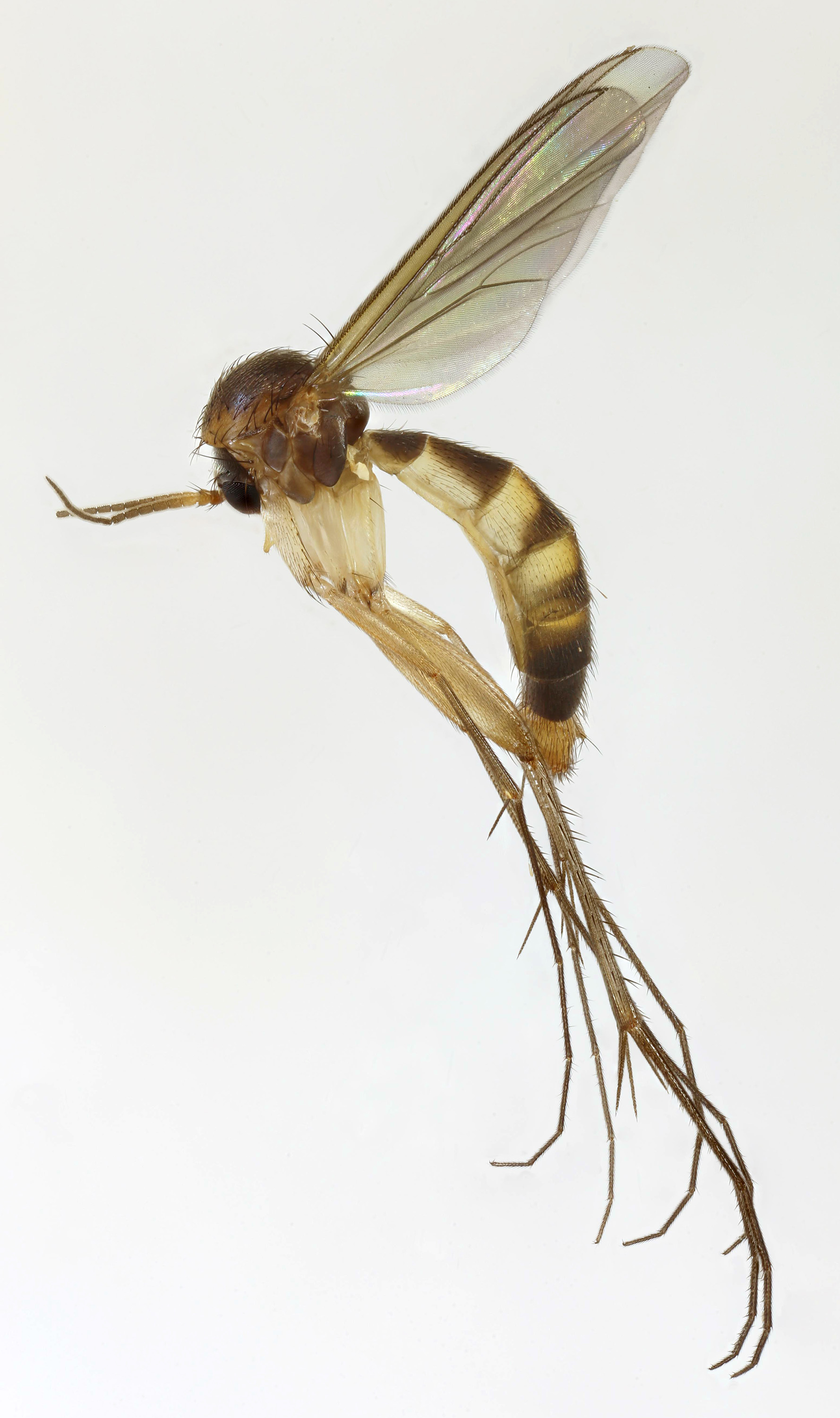

Scientific classification
- Domain: Eukaryota
- Kingdom: Animalia
- Phylum: Arthropoda
- Class: Insecta
- Order: Diptera
- Family: Mycetophilidae
- Genus: Exechia
- Species: E. festiva

Binomial name
- Exechia festiva Winnertz, 1863

= Exechia festiva =

Species of fly

Exechia festiva is a species of 'fungus gnat' in the family Mycetophilidae.
