= Symmerus lautus =

Scientific classification
- Domain: Eukaryota
- Kingdom: Animalia
- Phylum: Arthropoda
- Class: Insecta
- Order: Diptera
- Family: Ditomyiidae
- Genus: Symmerus
- Species: S. lautus

Binomial name
- Symmerus lautus (Loew, 1869)

Synonyms
- Plesiastina lautus Loew, 1869; Plesiastina tristis Loew, 1869; Symmerus dilutus Fisher, 1938

Species of fly

Symmerus lautus is a species of non-brachycera in the family Ditomyiidae.
