= Ditomyia fasciata =

Scientific classification
- Kingdom: Animalia
- Phylum: Arthropoda
- Class: Insecta
- Order: Diptera
- Family: Ditomyiidae
- Genus: Ditomyia
- Species: D. fasciata

Binomial name
- Ditomyia fasciata (Meigen, 1818)

Synonyms
- Hebopteryx angulata Stæger, 1840; Mycetobia fasciata Meigen, 1818

Species of fly

Ditomyia fasciata is a species of fly in the family Ditomyiidae.
