= Symmerus vockerothi =

Scientific classification
- Domain: Eukaryota
- Kingdom: Animalia
- Phylum: Arthropoda
- Class: Insecta
- Order: Diptera
- Family: Ditomyiidae
- Genus: Symmerus
- Species: S. vockerothi

Binomial name
- Symmerus vockerothi Munroe, 1974

Species of fly

Symmerus vockerothi is a species of non-brachycera in the family Ditomyiidae.
