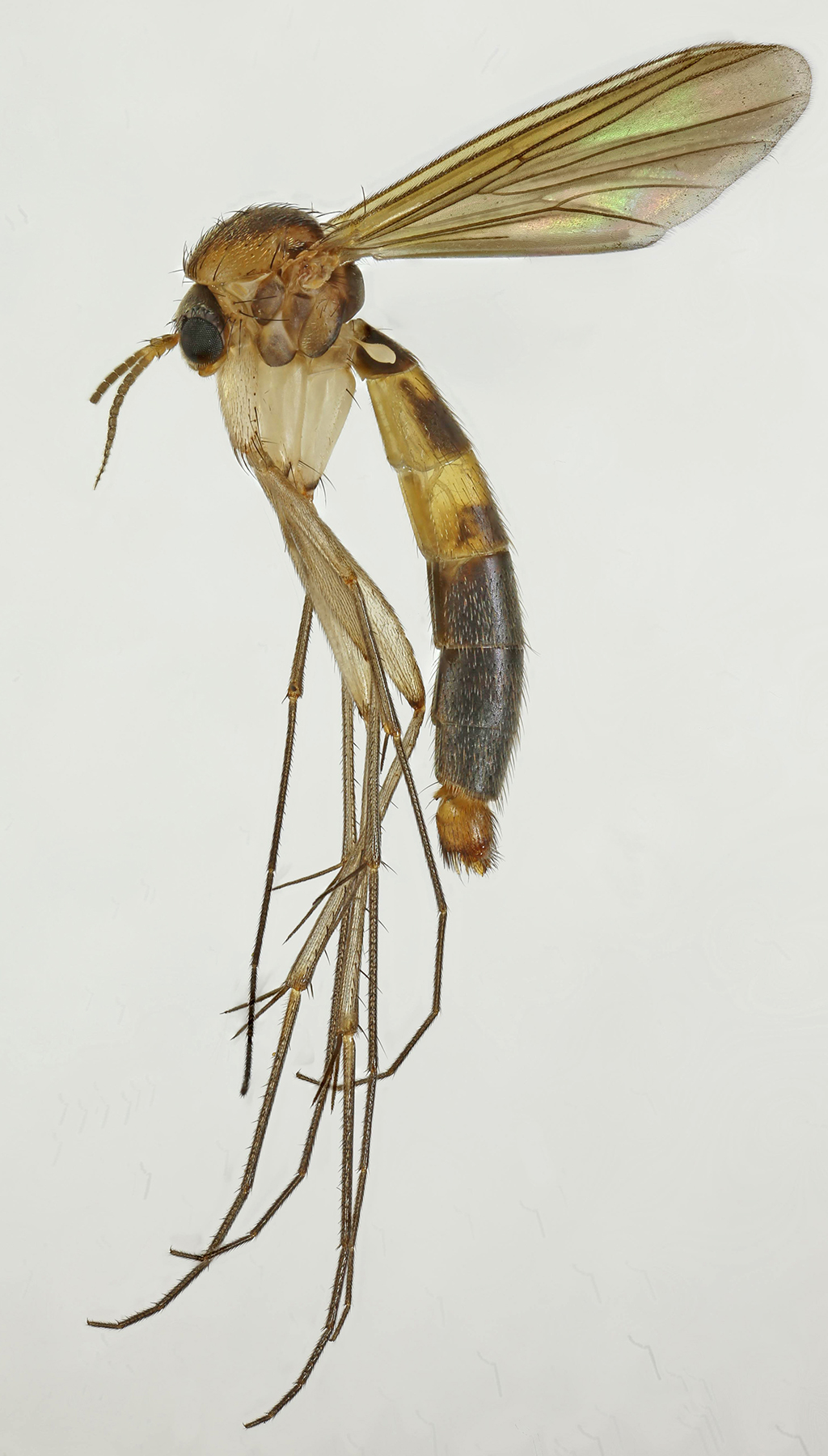
- Exechia contaminata North Wales

Scientific classification
- Kingdom: Animalia
- Phylum: Arthropoda
- Clade: Pancrustacea
- Class: Insecta
- Order: Diptera
- Family: Mycetophilidae
- Genus: Exechia
- Species: E. contaminata

Binomial name
- Exechia contaminata Winnertz, 1863

= Exechia contaminata =

Species of fly

Exechia contaminata is a Palearctic species of fungus gnat in the family Mycetophilidae. Exechia contaminata is chiefly or exclusively associated with Russula and Lactarius.

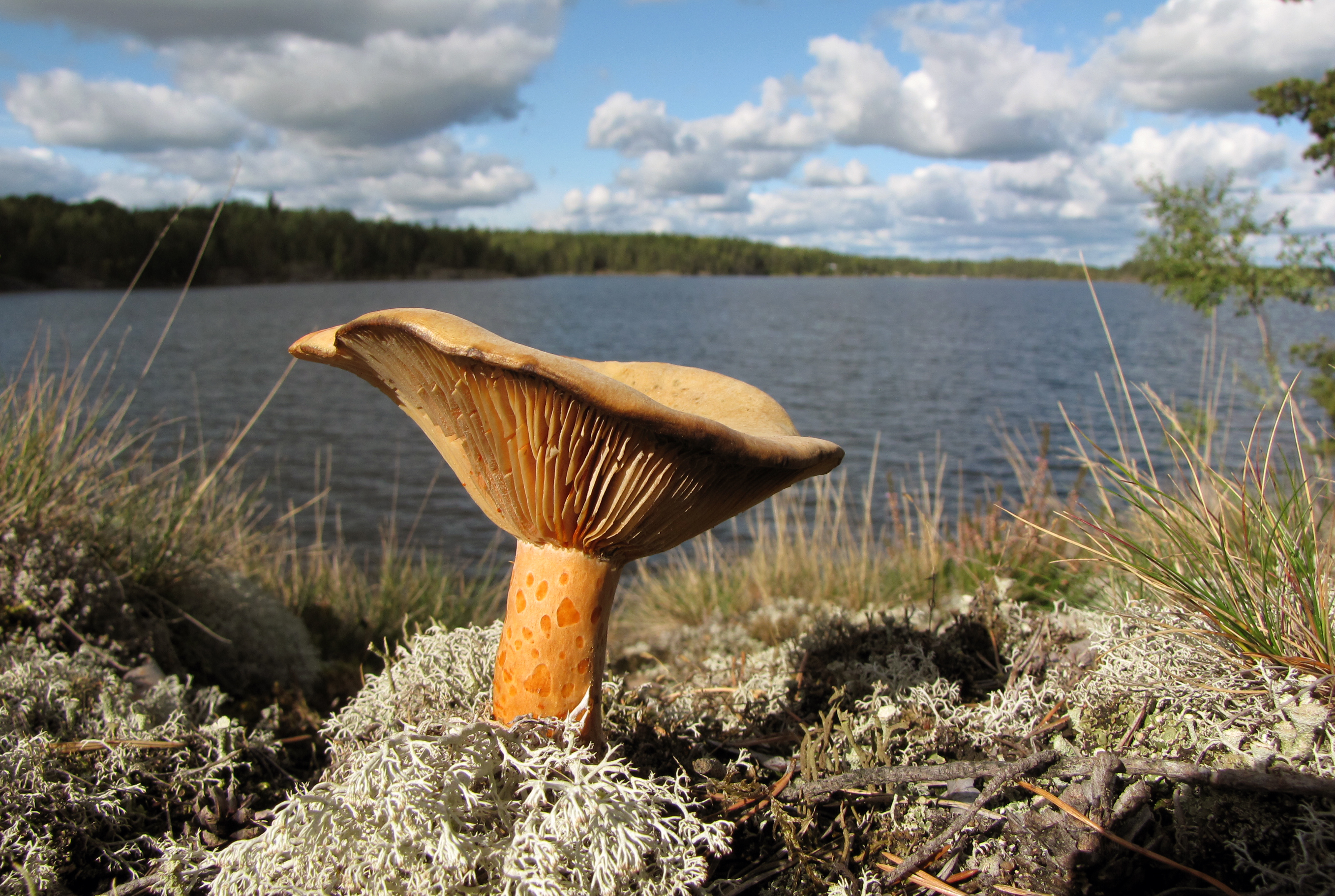
Habitat. Finland.
