= Ditomyia =

- Ditomyia fasciata

Scientific classification
- Domain: Eukaryota
- Kingdom: Animalia
- Phylum: Arthropoda
- Class: Insecta
- Order: Diptera
- Family: Ditomyiidae
- Genus: Ditomyia; Winnertz, 1846

Type species
- Ditomyia trifasciata Winnertz, 1846

Genus of flies

Ditomyia is a genus of fungus gnats in the family Ditomyiidae.

== Species ==
- D. carinata Zaitzev, 1980
- D. claripennis Saigusa, 1973
- D. euzona Loew, 1870
- D. fasciata (Meigen, 1818)
- D. insularis Zaitzev, 1994
- D. klimovae Zaitzev & Menzel, 1996
- D. macroptera Winnertz, 1852
- D. pilosella Statz, 1944
- D. potomaca Fisher, 1941
- D. spinifera Zaitzev, 1978
