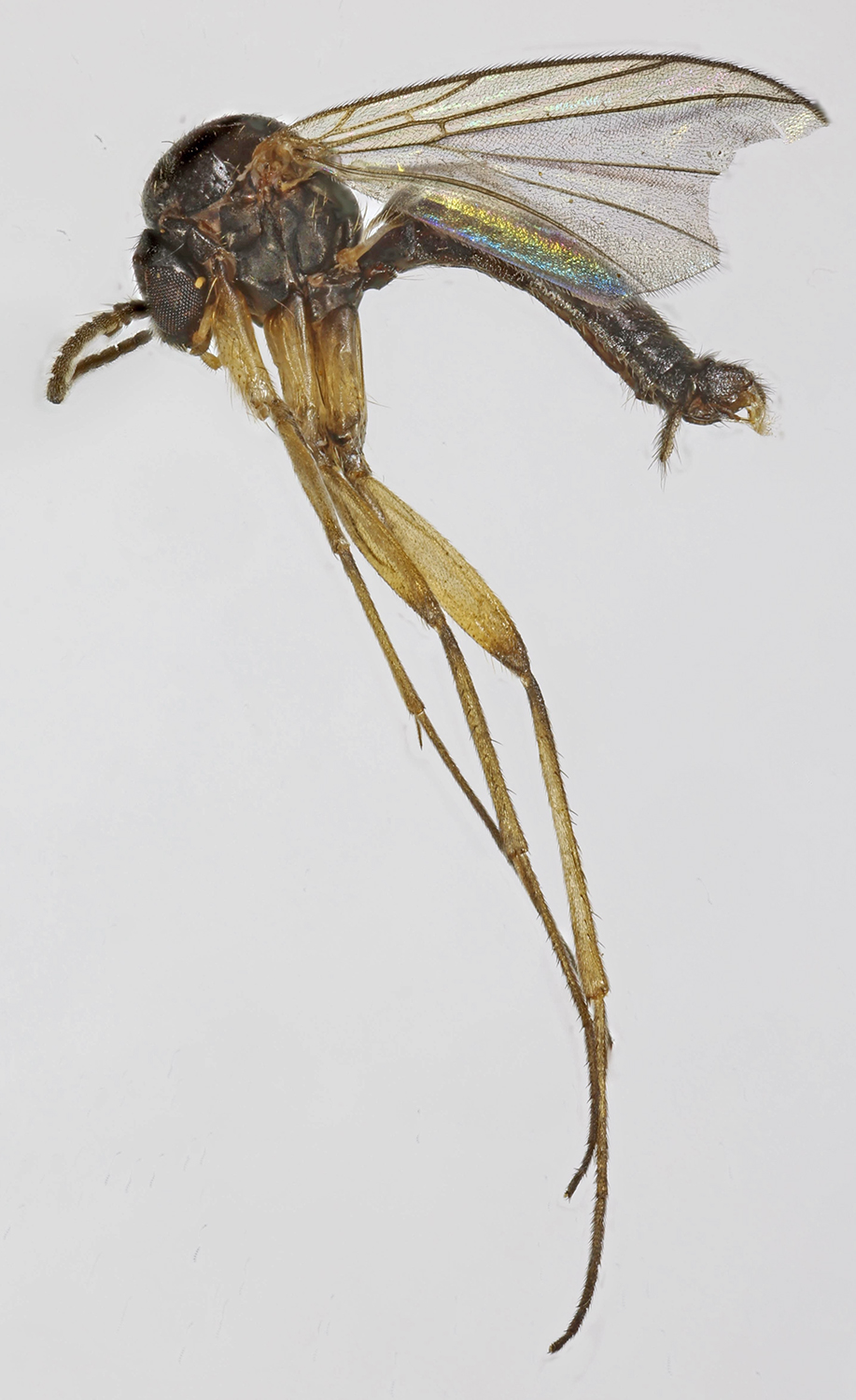
- Acnemia nitidicollis

Scientific classification
- Kingdom: Animalia
- Phylum: Arthropoda
- Class: Insecta
- Order: Diptera
- Family: Mycetophilidae
- Subfamily: Sciophilinae
- Genus: Acnemia; Winnertz, 1863

Type species
- Leia nitidicollis Meigen, 1818

Synonyms
- Agaricobia Philippi, 1865

= Acnemia =

Genus of flies

Acnemia is a genus of fly belonging to the family Mycetophilidae.

The genus was first described by Winnertz in 1863.

The genus has almost cosmopolitan distribution.

== Species ==
- Acnemia aino Okada, 1939
- Acnemia angusta Zaitzev, 1982
- Acnemia anoena Winnertz, 1863
- Acnemia arizonensis Zaitzev, 1982
- Acnemia asiatica Senior-White, 1924
- Acnemia bifida Zaitzev, 1982
- Acnemia bolsuisi Meunier, 1904
- Acnemia bolsuisii Meunier, 1904
- Acnemia braueri Strobl, 1895
- Acnemia californiensis Zaitzev, 1982
- Acnemia comata Zaitzev, 1982
- Acnemia cyclosma Cockerell, 1924
- Acnemia defecta (Walker, 1856)
- Acnemia falcata Zaitzev, 1982
- Acnemia falkei Matile & Vockeroth, 1977
- Acnemia fisherae Zaitzev, 1982
- Acnemia flaveola Coquillett, 1901
- Acnemia flavicoxa Freeman, 1951
- Acnemia freemani Lane, 1956
- Acnemia funerea Freeman, 1951
- Acnemia hyrcanica Zaitzev, 1984
- Acnemia johannseni Zaitzev, 1982
- Acnemia kurilensis Zaitzev, 2001
- Acnemia longipalpis Zaitzev, 2006
- Acnemia longipes Winnertz, 1863
- Acnemia macroclada Niu & Wu, 2010
- Acnemia neolongipes Zaitzev, 1982
- Acnemia nigra Strobl, 1895
- Acnemia nitidicollis (Meigen, 1818)
- Acnemia psylla Loew, 1870
- Acnemia sarmentacea Niu & Wu, 2010
- Acnemia similis Zaitzev, 1982
- Acnemia simplex Cockerell, 1921
- Acnemia spathulata Zaitzev, 2001
- Acnemia stellamicans Chandler, 1994
- Acnemia subtenebrosa Zaitzev, 1994
- Acnemia trifida Zaitzev, 1982
- Acnemia umbonala Niu & Wu, 2010
- Acnemia unica Zaitzev, 1982
- Acnemia ussuriensis Zaitzev, 1982
- Acnemia varipennis Coquillett, 1904
- Acnemia vittata Freeman, 1951
- Acnemia vockerothi Zaitzev, 1989
- Acnemia vratzatica Bechev, 1985
- Acnemia weigandi Plassmann, 1999
