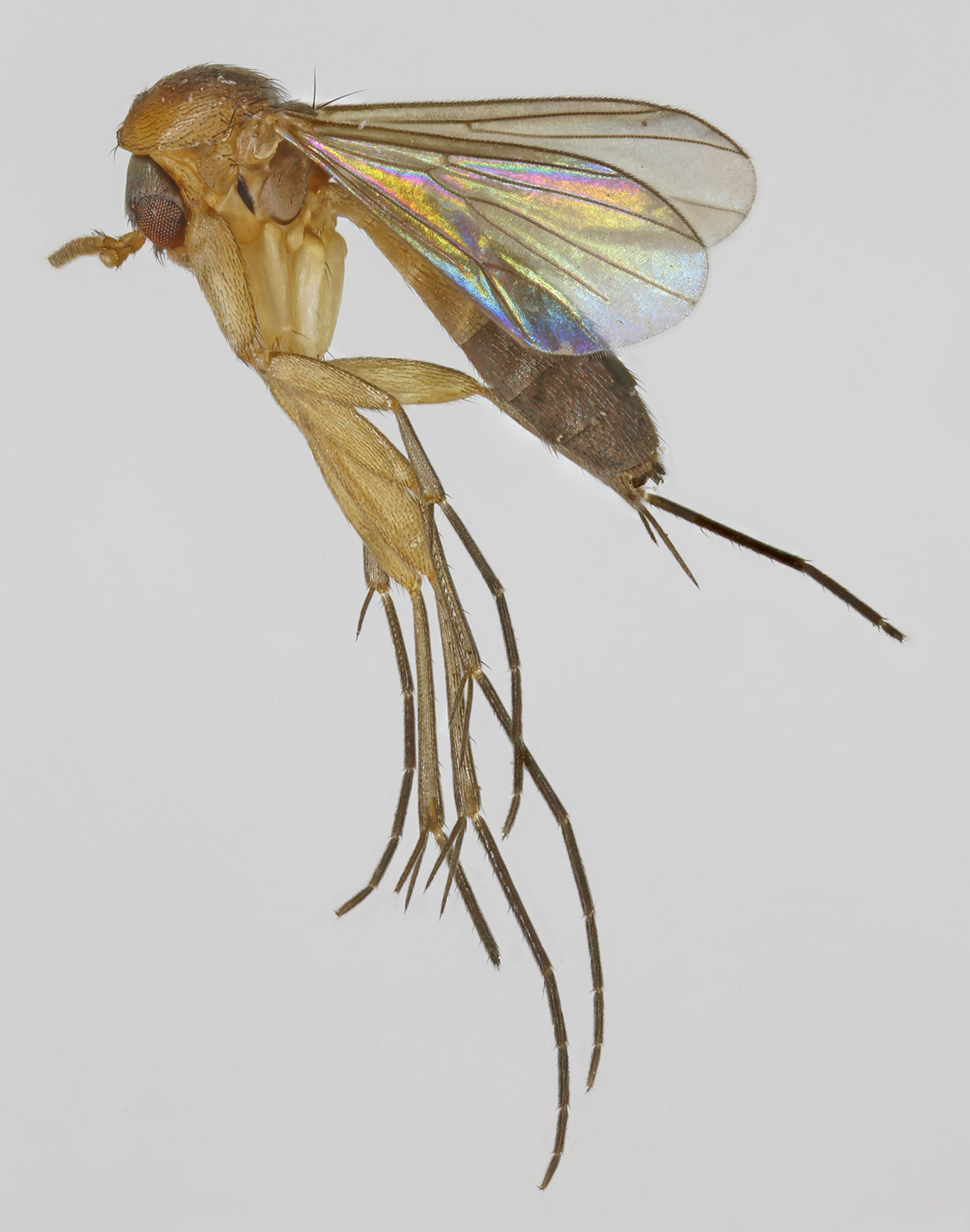
- Cordyla flaviceps North Wales

Scientific classification
- Kingdom: Animalia
- Phylum: Arthropoda
- Class: Insecta
- Order: Diptera
- Family: Mycetophilidae
- Genus: Cordyla
- Species: C. flaviceps

Binomial name
- Cordyla flaviceps Stæger, 1840

= Cordyla flaviceps =

Species of fly

Cordyla flaviceps is a Palearctic species of 'fungus gnat' in the family Mycetophilidae. The type-locality is Copenhagen (Denmark). C. flavicepsis a mycetophage associated with Russula and Lactarius.

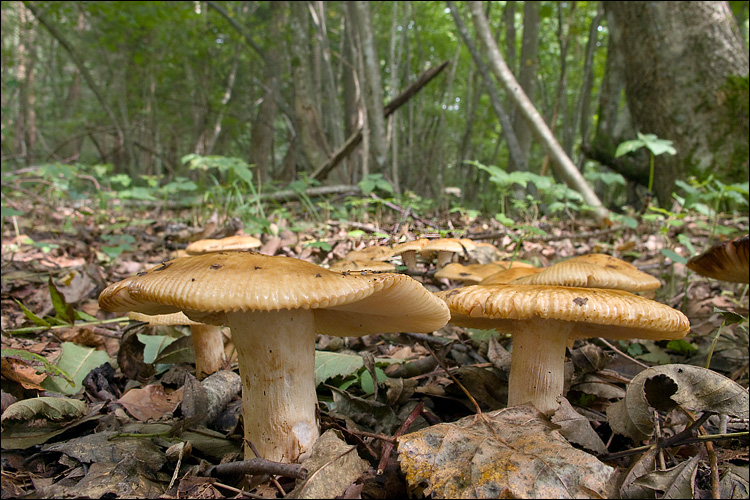
Habitat.Slovenia
