= Rhipidita =

Scientific classification
- Domain: Eukaryota
- Kingdom: Animalia
- Phylum: Arthropoda
- Class: Insecta
- Order: Diptera
- Family: Ditomyiidae
- Genus: Rhipidita; Edwards, 1940

Type species
- Rhipidita fusca Edwards, 1940

Synonyms
- Calliceratomyia Lane, 1946

Genus of flies

Rhipidita is a genus of fungus gnats in the family Ditomyiidae.

== Species ==
- R. fusca Edwards, 1940
- R. nigra Lane, 1952
- R. pectinata (Lane, 1946)
