= Nervijuncta =

Scientific classification
- Kingdom: Animalia
- Phylum: Arthropoda
- Clade: Pancrustacea
- Class: Insecta
- Order: Diptera
- Family: Ditomyiidae
- Genus: Nervijuncta; Marshall, 1896

Type species
- Nervijuncta nigrescens Marshall, 1896

Genus of flies

Nervijuncta is a genus of fungus gnats in the family Ditomyiidae.

== Species ==
- N. bicolor Edwards, 1927
- N. concinna Matile, 1988
- N. conjuncta (Freeman, 1951)
- N. evenhuisi Matile, 1988
- N. flavoscutellata Tonnoir, 1927
- N. harrisi Edwards, 1927
- N. hexachaeta Edwards, 1927
- N. hudsoni (Marshall, 1896)
- N. laffooni Lane, 1952
- N. longicauda Edwards, 1927
- N. marshalli Edwards, 1927
- N. nigrescens Marshall, 1896
- N. nigricornis Tonnoir, 1927
- N. nigricoxa Edwards, 1927
- N. ostensackeni Tonnoir, 1927
- N. parvicauda Edwards, 1927
- N. pilicornis Edwards, 1927
- N. pulchella Edwards, 1927
- N. punctata Tonnoir, 1927
- N. ruficeps Edwards, 1927
- N. tridens (Hutton, 1881)
- N. vicina Matile, 1988
- N. wakefieldi (Edwards, 1921)
