= Australosymmerus =

Scientific classification
- Kingdom: Animalia
- Phylum: Arthropoda
- Clade: Pancrustacea
- Class: Insecta
- Order: Diptera
- Family: Ditomyiidae
- Genus: Australosymmerus; Freeman, 1954

Type species
- Centrocnemis stigmatica Philippi, 1865

Synonyms
- Australomyia Freeman, 1951; Austrosymmerus Papavero, 1977; Centrocnemis Philippi, 1865; Nothosymmerus Papavero, 1977; Araeostylus Munroe, 1974; Calosymmerus Munroe, 1974; Crionisca Colless, 1970; Melosymmerus Munroe, 1974; Tantrus Munroe, 1974; Vellicocauda Munroe, 1974; Ventrilobus Munroe, 1974

Genus of flies

Australosymmerus is a genus of fungus gnats in the family Ditomyiidae.

== Species ==
- A. aculeatus (Edwards, 1921)
- A. acutus Munroe, 1974
- A. anthostylus Colless, 1970
- A. basalis (Tonnoir, 1927)
- A. bifasciatus (Williston, 1900)
- A. bisetosus (Edwards, 1940)
- A. bivittatus (Freeman, 1951)
- A. bororo (Lane, 1947)
- A. collessi Munroe, 1974
- A. confusus Munroe, 1974
- A. cornutus Colless, 1970
- A. fumipennis (Tonnoir, 1927)
- A. fuscinervis (Edwards, 1921)
- A. guarani (Lane, 1947)
- A. guayanasi (Lane, 1947)
- A. imperfectus (Riek, 1954)
- A. incerta (Bigot, 1888)
- A. insolitus (Walker, 1836)
- A. lenkoi Lane, 1959
- A. lobatus Munroe, 1974
- A. maculatus Munroe, 1974
- A. magellani Munroe, 1974
- A. magnificus Munroe, 1974
- A. minutus Munroe, 1974
- A. montorum Munroe, 1974
- A. naevius Colless, 1970
- A. nebulosus Colless, 1970
- A. nitidus (Tonnoir, 1927)
- A. pedifer (Edwards, 1940)
- A. peruensis Munroe, 1974
- A. propinquus Colless, 1970
- A. rieki (Colless, 1970)
- A. simplex (Freeman, 1951)
- A. stigmaticus (Philippi, 1865)
- A. tillyardi (Tonnoir, 1927)
- A. tonnoiri Colless, 1970
- A. trivittatus (Edwards, 1927)
- A. truncatus Munroe, 1974
- A. tupi (Lane, 1947)
