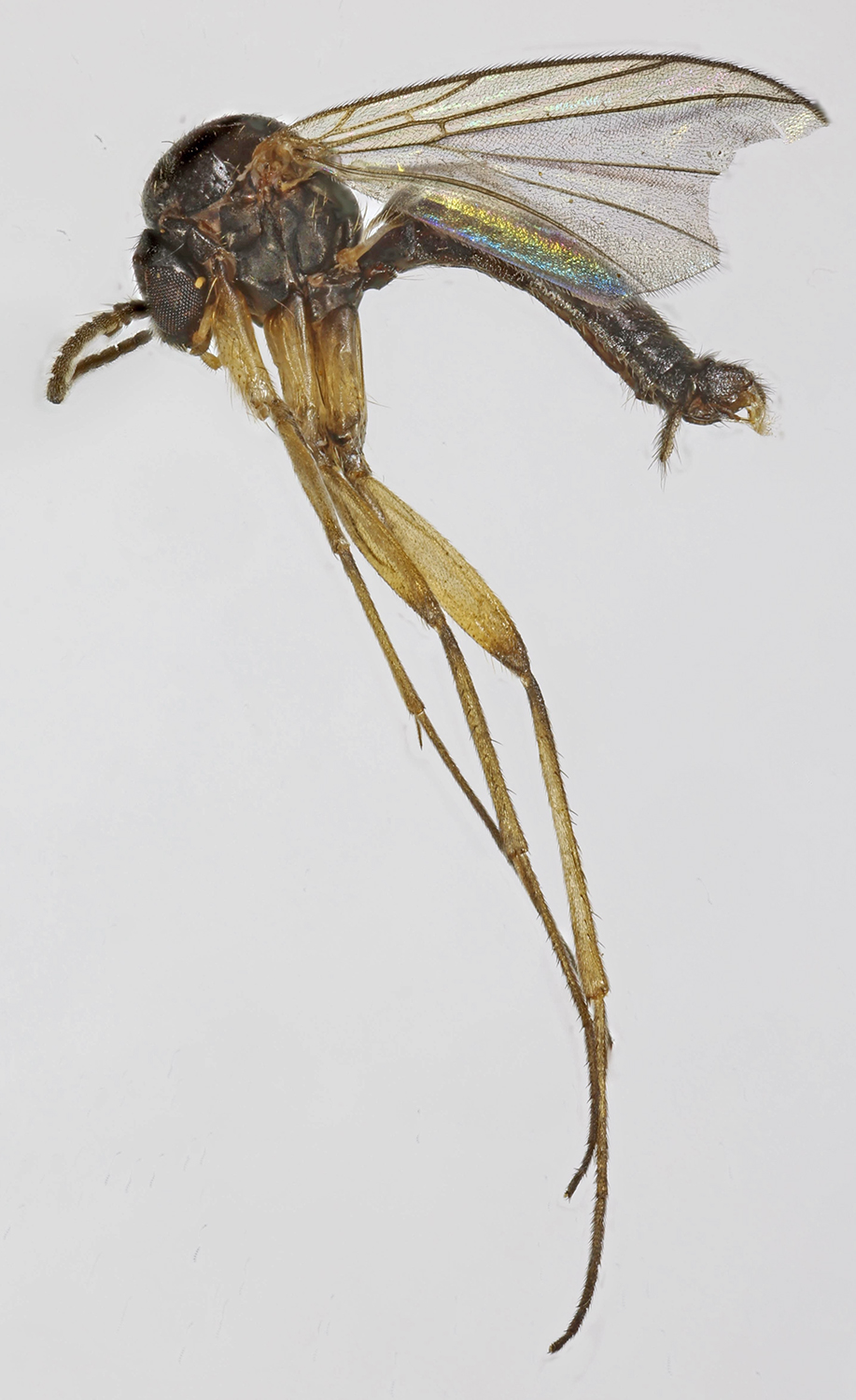
- Acnemia nitidicollis North Wales

Scientific classification
- Kingdom: Animalia
- Phylum: Arthropoda
- Class: Insecta
- Order: Diptera
- Family: Mycetophilidae
- Genus: Acnemia
- Species: A. nitidicollis

Binomial name
- Acnemia nitidicollis (Meigen, 1818)

Synonyms
- Leia nitidicollis Meigen, 1818

= Acnemia nitidicollis =

Species of fly

Acnemia nitidicollis is a Palearctic species of 'fungus gnat' in the family Mycetophilidae. The larvae of Acnemia are mycetophagous in rotting wood.

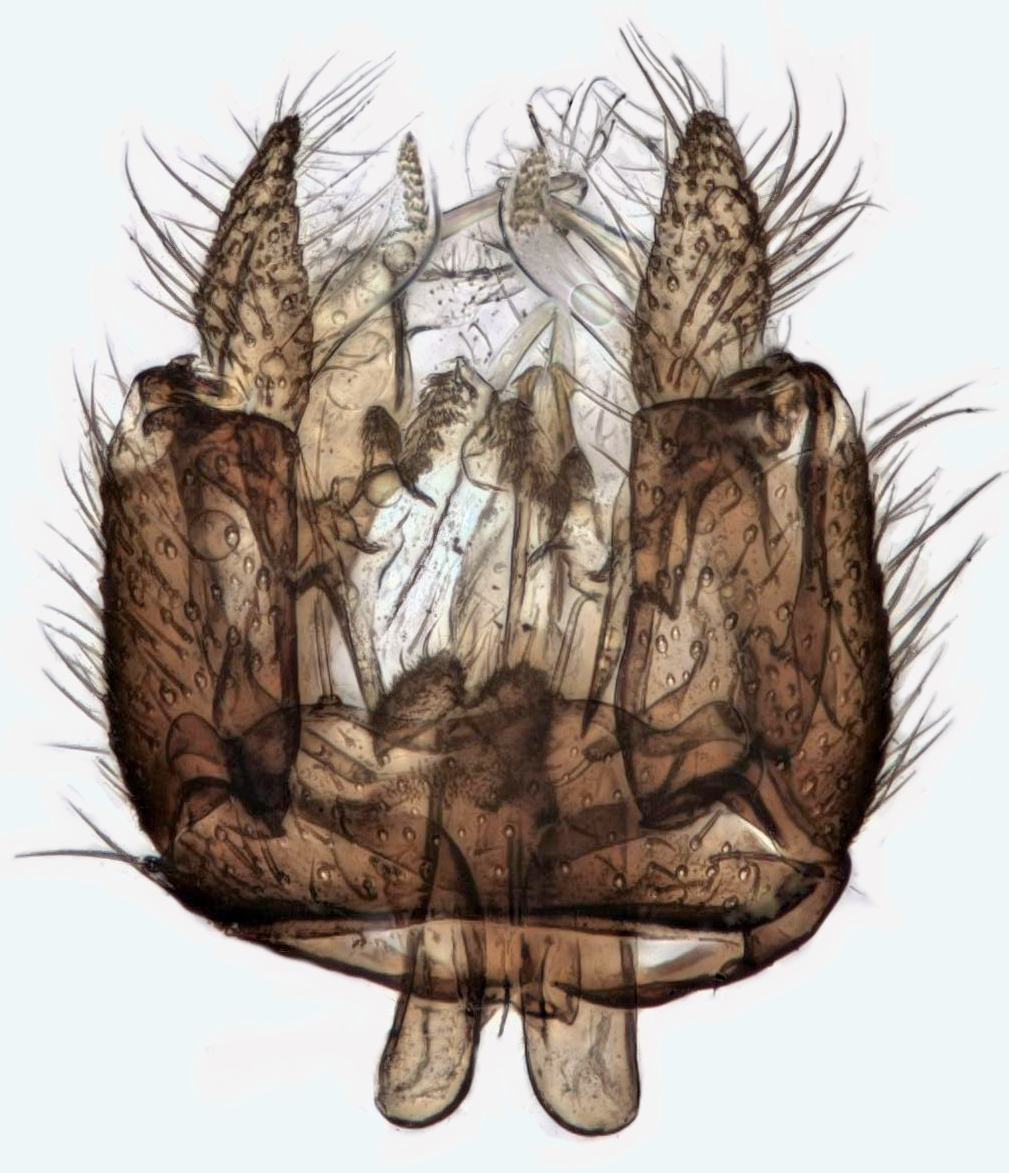
Male terminalia.

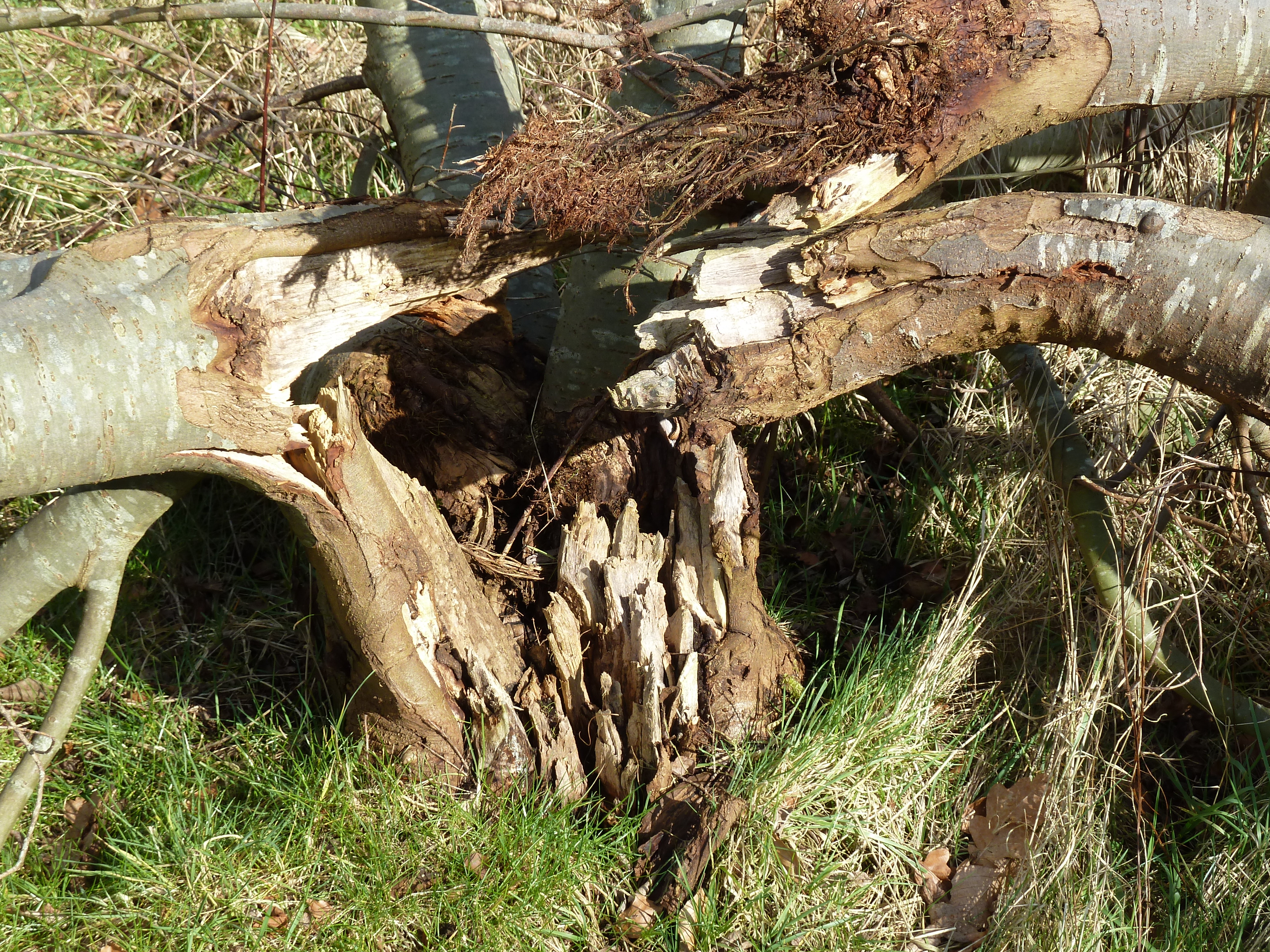
Habitat in Ireland.
