= Asioditomyia =

Scientific classification
- Domain: Eukaryota
- Kingdom: Animalia
- Phylum: Arthropoda
- Class: Insecta
- Order: Diptera
- Family: Ditomyiidae
- Genus: Asioditomyia; Saigusa, 1973

Type species
- Ditomyia japonica Sasakawa, 1963

Genus of flies

Asioditomyia is a genus of fungus gnats in the family Ditomyiidae.

== Species ==
- A. japonica (Sasakawa, 1963)
