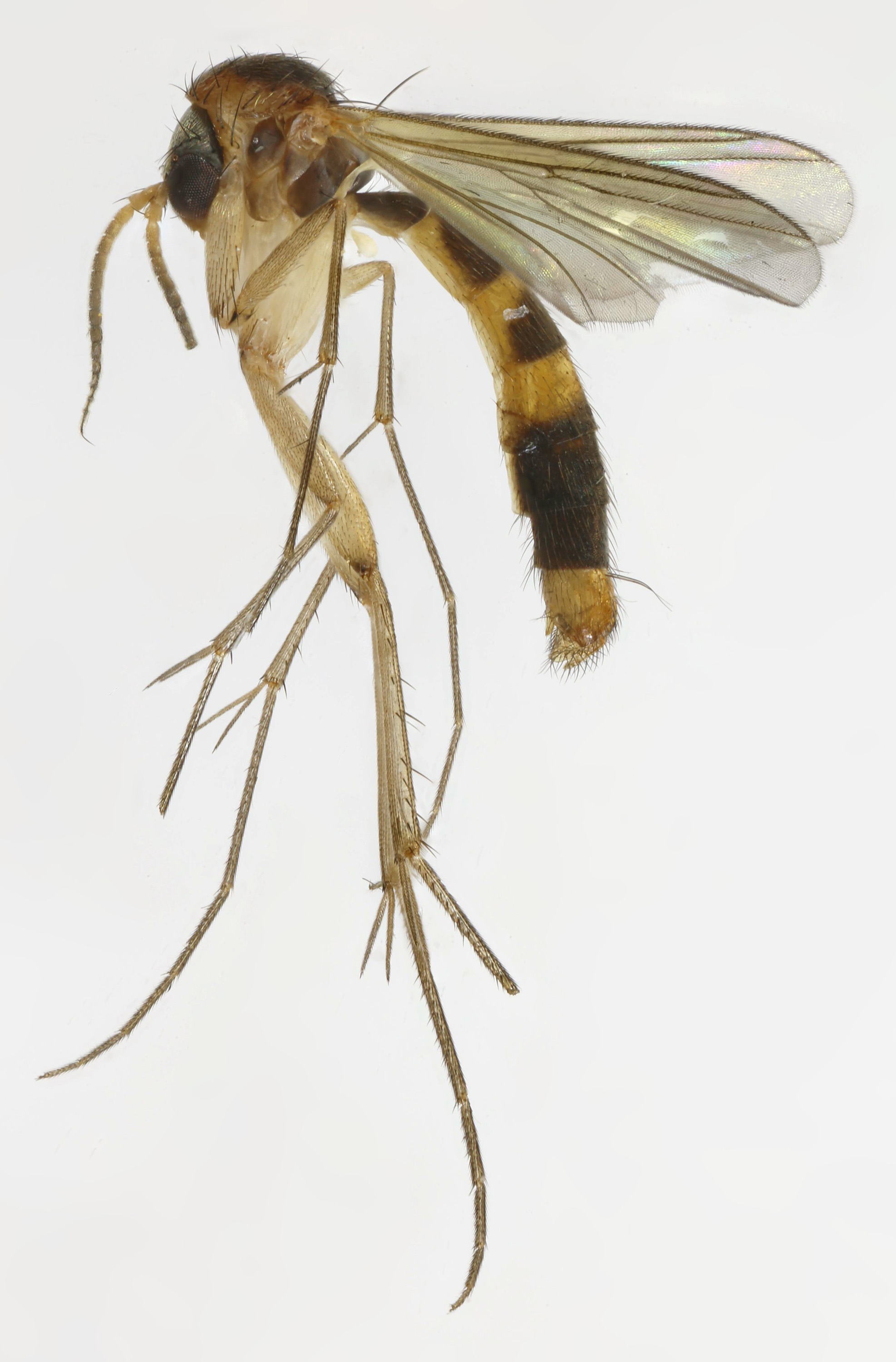
- Allodia

Scientific classification
- Domain: Eukaryota
- Kingdom: Animalia
- Phylum: Arthropoda
- Class: Insecta
- Order: Diptera
- Family: Mycetophilidae
- Subfamily: Mycetophilinae
- Tribe: Exechiini; Edwards, 1925

= Exechiini =

Tribe of flies

Exechiini is a tribe of fungus gnats in the family Mycetophilidae. There are about 13 genera and at least 130 described species in Exechiini.

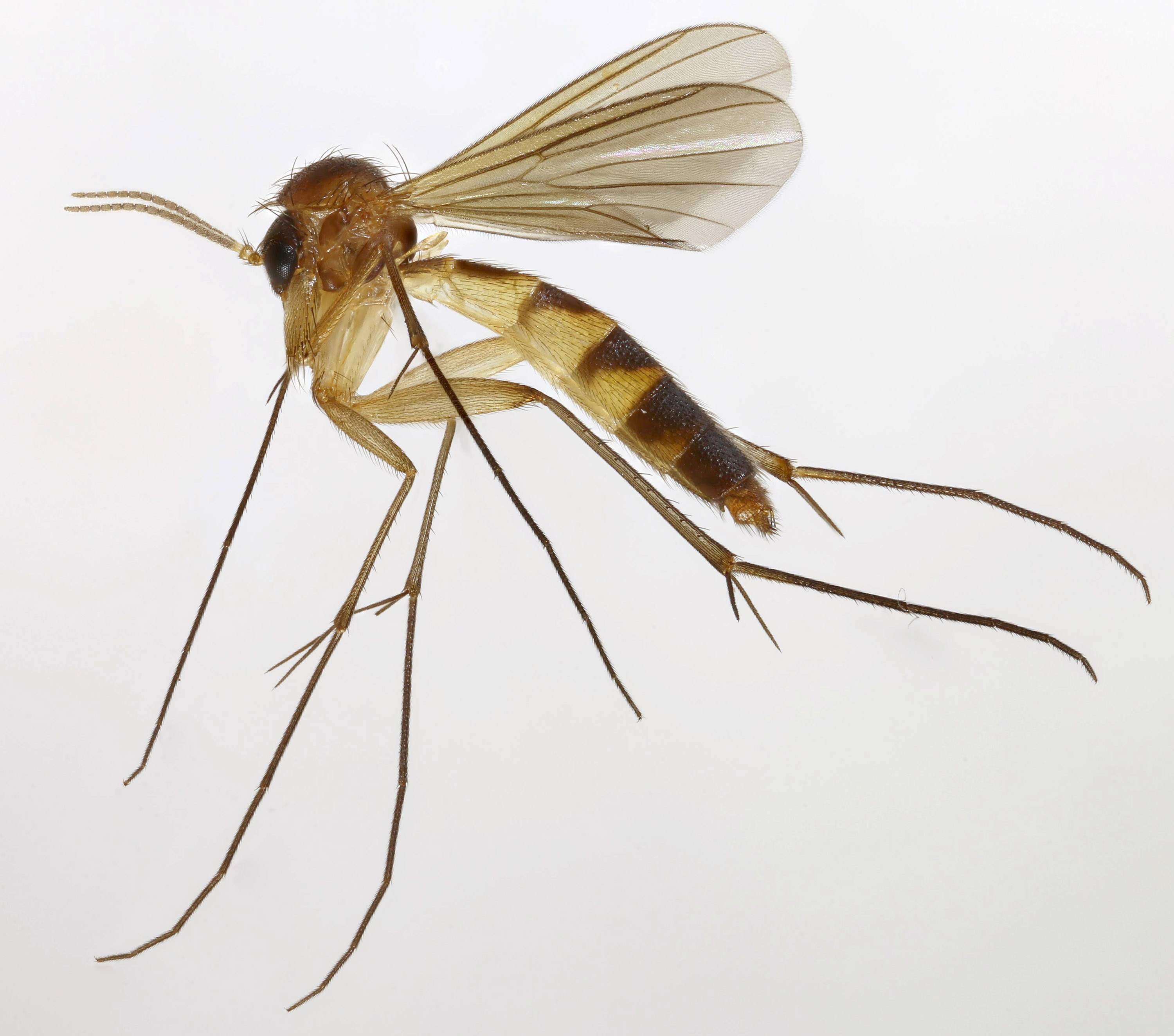
Exechiopsis

== Genera ==
These 13 genera belong to the tribe Exechiini:

- Allodia Winnertz, 1863^{i c g b}
- Allodiopsis Tuomikoski, 1966^{i c g}
- Anatella Winnertz, 1863^{i c g}
- Brachypeza Winnertz, 1863^{i c g}
- Brevicornu Marshall, 1896^{i c g b}
- Cordyla Meigen, 1803^{i c g b}
- Exechia Winnertz, 1863^{i c g b}
- Exechiopsis Tuomikoski, 1966^{i c g b}
- Pseudexechia Tuomikoski, 1966^{i c g}
- Pseudobrachypeza Tuomikoski, 1966^{i c g}
- Rymosia Winnertz, 1863^{i c g b}
- Stigmatomeria Tuomikoski, 1966^{i c g}
- Tarnania Tuomikoski, 1966^{i c g}

Data sources: i = ITIS, c = Catalogue of Life, g = GBIF, b = Bugguide.net
