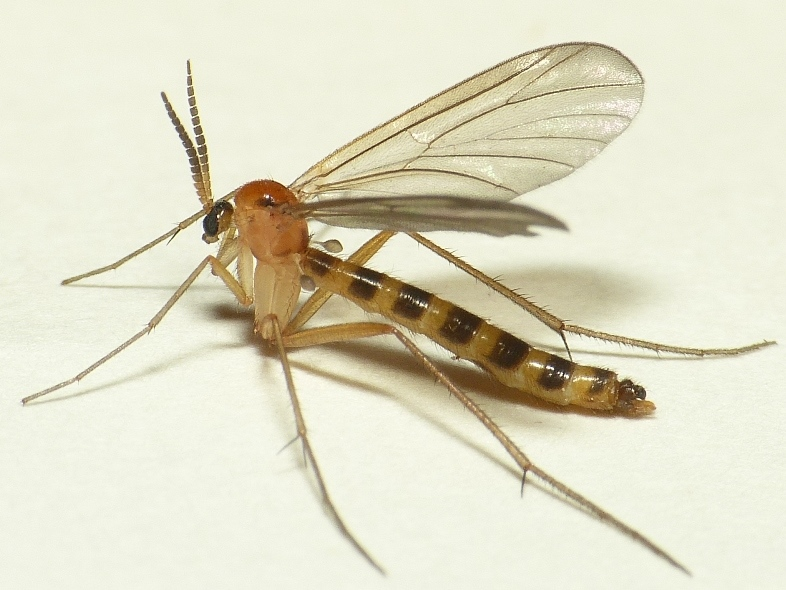
- Symmerus annulatus

Scientific classification
- Kingdom: Animalia
- Phylum: Arthropoda
- Class: Insecta
- Order: Diptera
- Family: Ditomyiidae
- Genus: Symmerus; Walker, 1848

Type species
- Symmerus ferrugineus Walker, 1848

= Symmerus =

Genus of flies

Symmerus is a genus of fungus gnats and gall midges in the family Ditomyiidae. There are about five described species in Symmerus.

== Species ==
- S. akikoae Saigusa, 1973
- S. annulatus (Meigen, 1830)^{i c g}
- S. antennalis Okada, 1936
- S. balticus Edwards, 1921
- S. brevicornis Okada, 1939
- S. coqula Garrett, 1925^{i c g}
- S. defectivus (Loew, 1850)
- S. elongatus Saigusa, 1973
- S. fuscicaudatus Saigusa, 1973
- S. kubani Ševčik, 2000
- S. latus Ostroverkhova, 1979
- S. lautus (Loew, 1870)^{i c g b}
- S. nepalensis Munroe, 1974
- S. nobilis Lackschewitz, 1937
- S. pectinatus Saigusa, 1966
- S. uncatus Munroe, 1974^{i c g b}
- S. vockerothi Munroe, 1974^{i c g b}

Data sources: i = ITIS, c = Catalogue of Life, g = GBIF, b = Bugguide.net
