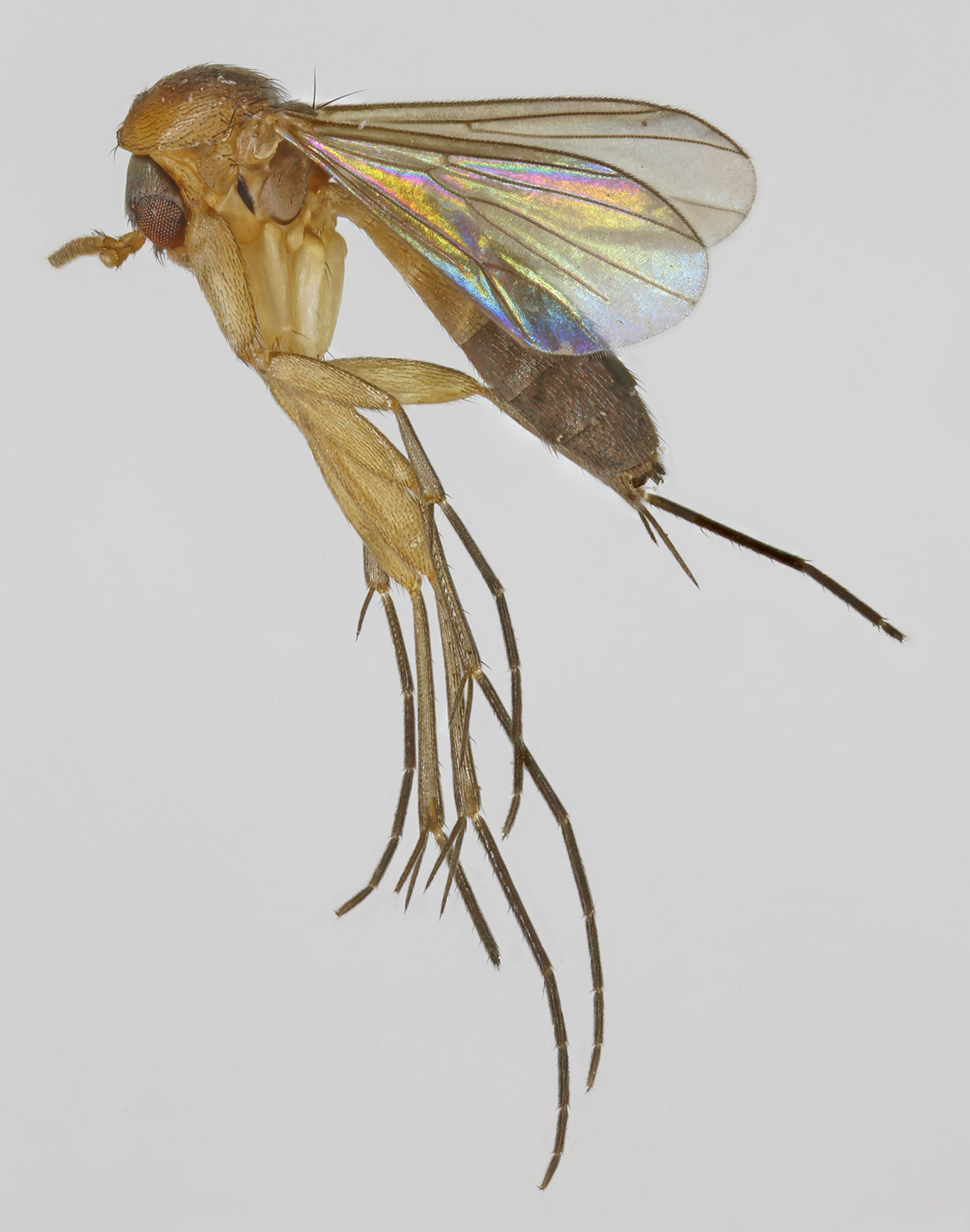
- Cordyla flaviceps North Wales

Scientific classification
- Domain: Eukaryota
- Kingdom: Animalia
- Phylum: Arthropoda
- Class: Insecta
- Order: Diptera
- Family: Mycetophilidae
- Tribe: Exechiini
- Genus: Cordyla; Meigen, 1803

Synonyms
- Polyxena Meigen, 1800; Pachypalpus Macquart, 1834

= Cordyla (fly) =

Genus of flies

Cordyla is a genus of fungus gnats in the family Mycetophilidae. There are at least 30 described species in Cordyla.

== Species ==
These 39 species belong to the genus Cordyla:

- C. bergensis (Barendrecht, 1938)^{c g}
- C. bicornuta (Landrock, 1926)^{c g}
- C. bidenticulata Sasakawa & Ishizaki, 2003^{c g}
- C. bomloensis Kjaerandsen & Kurina, 2004^{c g}
- C. borealisa Wu & Zheng, 2000^{c g}
- C. borneoensis Kurina, 2005^{c g}
- C. brevicornis (Staeger, 1840)^{c g}
- C. confera Garrett, 1925^{i c g}
- C. crassicornis Meigen, 1818^{c g}
- C. crassipalpis Dufour, 1839^{c g}
- C. fasciata Meigen, 1830^{c g}
- C. festiva (Costa, 1957)^{c g}
- C. fissa Edwards, 1925^{c g}
- C. flaviceps (Staeger, 1840)^{c g}
- C. fusca Meigen, 1804^{c g}
- C. geminata Sasakawa, 2005^{c g}
- C. gracilis Fisher, 1938^{i c g}
- C. insons Lastovka & Matile, 1974^{c g}
- C. jani Kurina, 2005^{c g}
- C. manca Johannsen, 1912^{i c g b}
- C. monegrensis Chandler & Blasco-Zumeta, 2001^{c g}
- C. murina Winnertz, 1863^{c g}
- C. neglecta Johannsen, 1912^{i c g}
- C. nitens Winnertz, 1863^{c g}
- C. nitidula Edwards, 1925^{c g}
- C. orientalis Sevcik, 2001^{c g}
- C. parva Garrett, 1925^{i c g}
- C. parvipalpis Edwards, 1925^{c g}
- C. pusilla Edwards, 1925^{i c g}
- C. recens Johannsen, 1912^{i c g}
- C. scita Johannsen, 1912^{i c g}
- C. scutellata Garrett, 1925^{c g}
- C. semiflava (Staeger, 1840)^{c g}
- C. sixi (Barendrecht, 1938)^{c g}
- C. styliforceps (Bukowski, 1934)^{c g}
- C. toraia Kurina, 2005^{c g}
- C. verio Garrett, 1925^{i c g}
- C. vitiosa Winnertz, 1863^{c g}
- C. volucris Johannsen, 1909^{i c g}

Data sources: i = ITIS, c = Catalogue of Life, g = GBIF, b = Bugguide.net
