= Cordyla manca =

Scientific classification
- Domain: Eukaryota
- Kingdom: Animalia
- Phylum: Arthropoda
- Class: Insecta
- Order: Diptera
- Family: Mycetophilidae
- Genus: Cordyla
- Species: C. manca

Binomial name
- Cordyla manca Johannsen, 1912

Species of fly

Cordyla manca is a species of fungus gnat in the family Mycetophilidae.
