= Neocrionisca =

Scientific classification
- Domain: Eukaryota
- Kingdom: Animalia
- Phylum: Arthropoda
- Class: Insecta
- Order: Diptera
- Family: Ditomyiidae
- Genus: Neocrionisca; Papavero, 1977

Type species
- Neocrionisca collessi Papavero, 1977

Genus of flies

Neocrionisca is a genus of fungus gnats in the family Ditomyiidae.

== Species ==
- N. collessi Papavero, 1977
