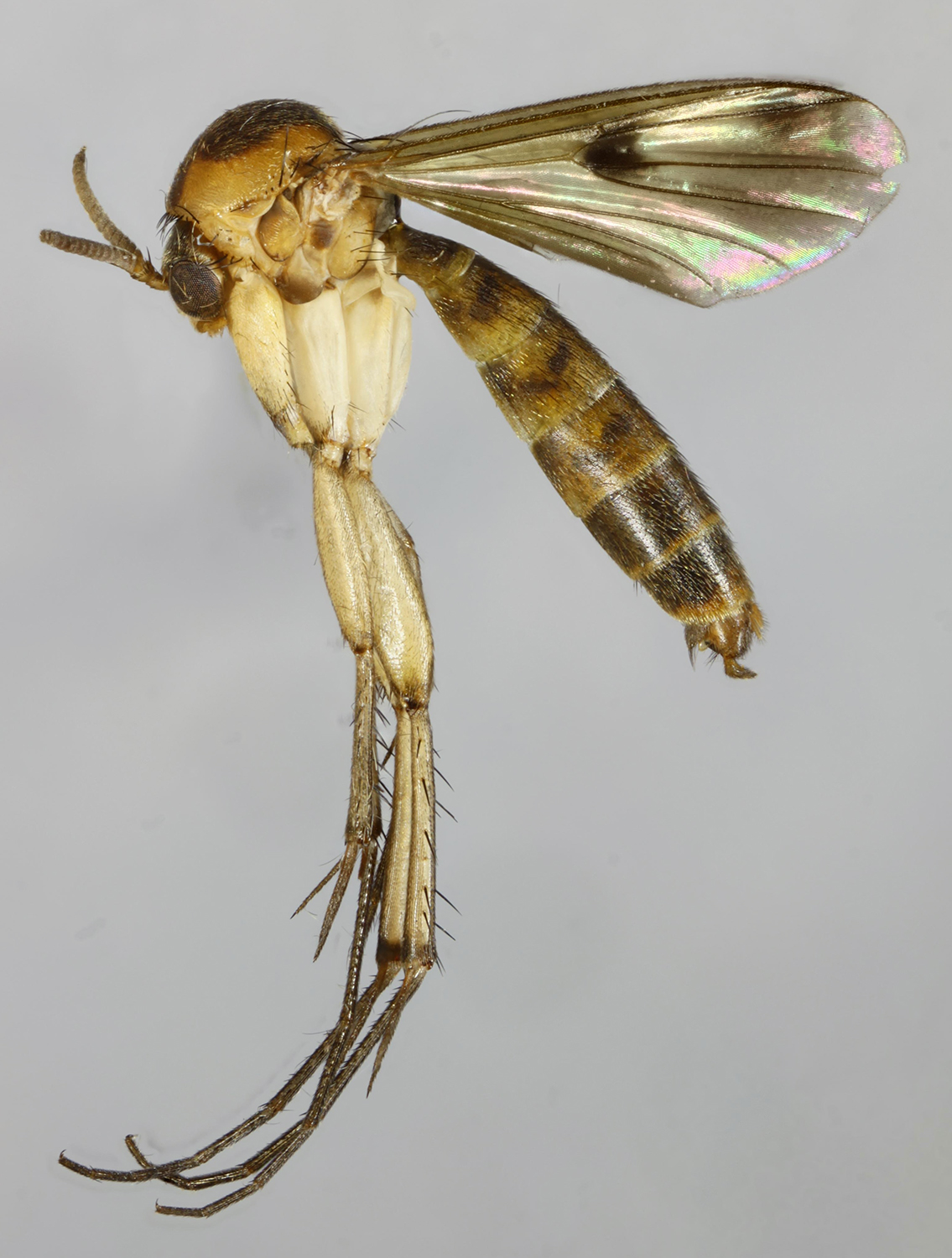
- Brachypeza bisignata

Scientific classification
- Domain: Eukaryota
- Kingdom: Animalia
- Phylum: Arthropoda
- Class: Insecta
- Order: Diptera
- Family: Mycetophilidae
- Tribe: Exechiini
- Genus: Brachypeza; Winnertz, 1863

= Brachypeza (fly) =

Genus of flies

Brachypeza is a genus of flies belonging to the family Mycetophilidae.

The species of this genus are found in Europe and Northern America.

Species:

- Brachypeza abita Scudder, 1877
- Brachypeza altaica Zaitzev, 1987
