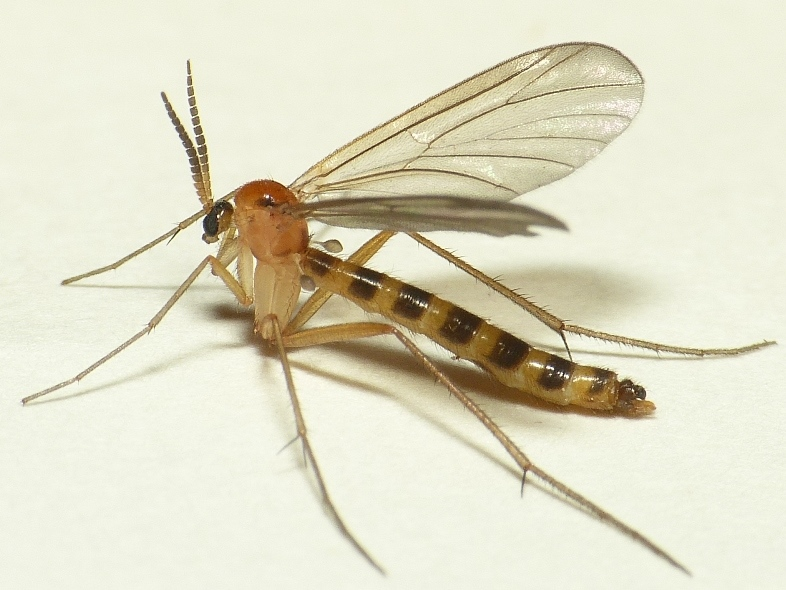
- Symmerus annulatus

Scientific classification
- Kingdom: Animalia
- Phylum: Arthropoda
- Clade: Pancrustacea
- Class: Insecta
- Order: Diptera
- Suborder: Nematocera
- Infraorder: Bibionomorpha
- Superfamily: Sciaroidea
- Family: Ditomyiidae; Keilin, 1919

Genera
- See text

= Ditomyiidae =

Ditomyiidae Temporal range: Cenomanian–Recent

Family of flies

The Ditomyiidae are a small (90 species) family of flies (Diptera).They are found worldwide (except in the Afrotropical Region), most species are found in the Australasian and Neotropical realms. There are only two genera in Europe Ditomyia Winnertz, 1846 and Symmerus Walker, 1848 Ditomyia is found in Central Europe Symmerus in Northern Europe Symmerus is endemic to the Palaearctic.

Wing detail

== Genera ==
- Asioditomyia Saigusa, 1973
- Australosymmerus (Freeman, 1951)
- Ditomyia Winnertz, 1846
- Neocrionisca Papavero, 1977
- Nervijuncta Marshall, 1896
- Rhipidita Edwards, 1940
- Symmerus Walker, 1848
- †Burmasymmerus Burmese amber, Myanmar, Late Cretaceous (Cenomanian)
