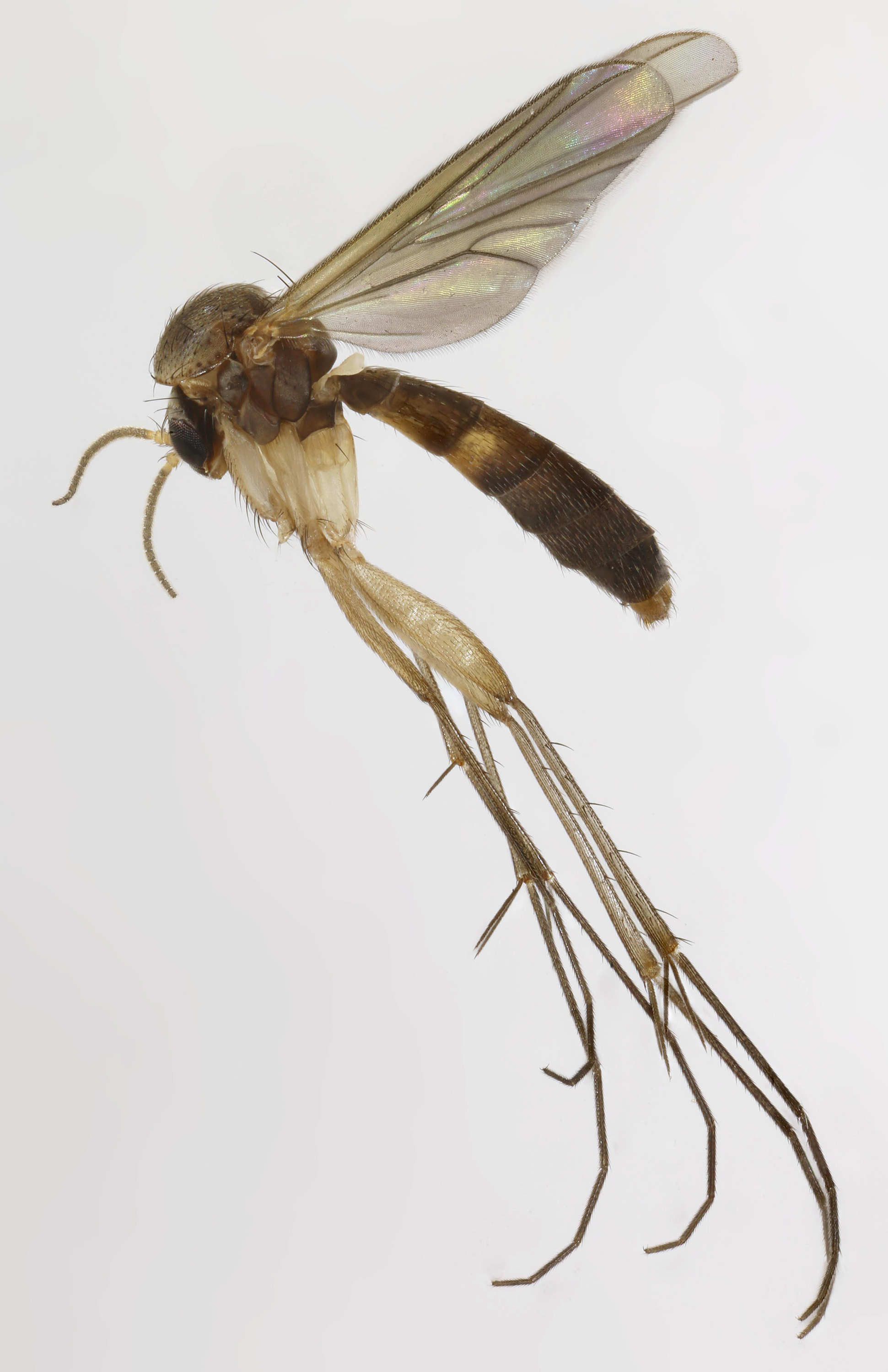

Scientific classification
- Domain: Eukaryota
- Kingdom: Animalia
- Phylum: Arthropoda
- Class: Insecta
- Order: Diptera
- Family: Mycetophilidae
- Subfamily: Mycetophilinae
- Tribe: Exechiini
- Genus: Exechia; Winnertz, 1863

Diversity
- at least 180 species

= Exechia =

Genus of flies

Exechia is a genus of fungus gnats in the family Mycetophilidae. There are more than 180 described species in Exechia.

== See also ==
- List of Exechia species
