= Johannes Winnertz =

German entomologist

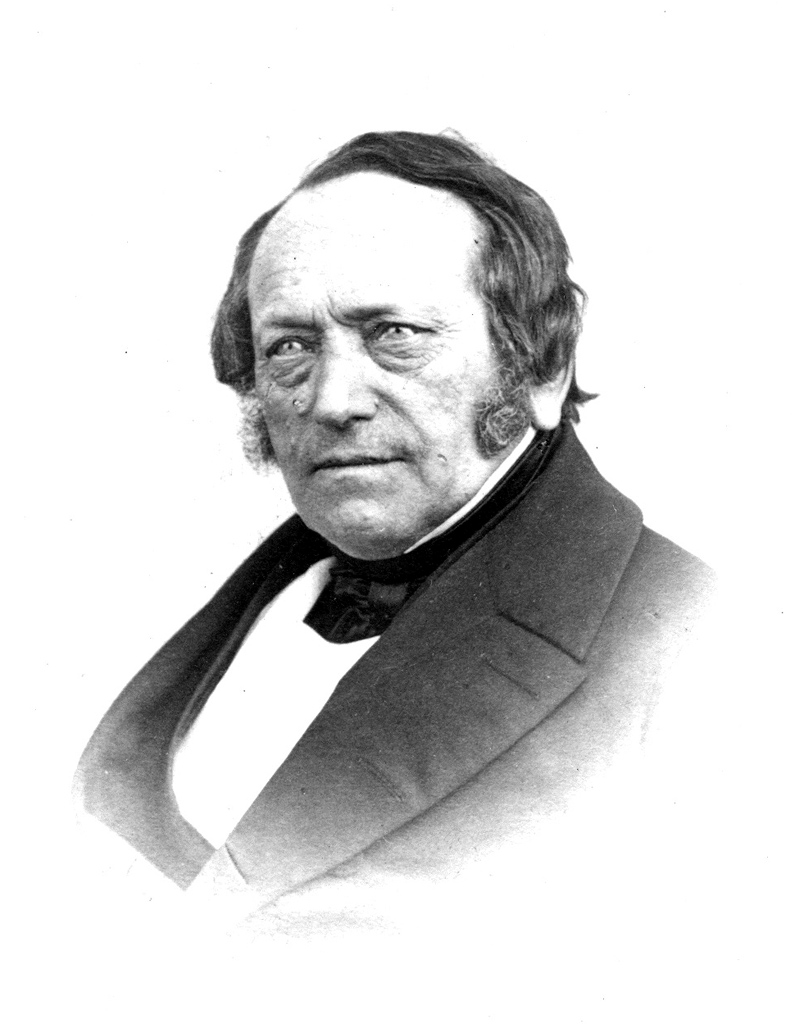
- Born: 11 February 1800
- Died: 24 July 1890 (aged 90)
- Occupation: entomologist
- Known for: specialising in Diptera

Johannes Winnertz (11 February 1800 – 24 July 1890) was a German entomologist specialising in Diptera.

He was a dealer in Krefeld.

== Works ==
- Beitrag zur Kenntniss der Gattung Ceratopogon Meigen. 1852
- Beitrag zu einer Monographie der Gallmücken. 1853
- Beitrag zu einer Monographie der Pilzmücken. 1863
- Beitrag zu einer Monographie der Sciarinen. Wien, 1867

== Collections ==
Winnertz' collections of Diptera are in Senckenberg Museum, Naturhistorisches Museum Vienna and the Natural History Museum, Bonn.

== Sources ==
- Osten-Sacken, C. R. 1903: Record of my life and work in entomology. - Cambridge (Mass.)
