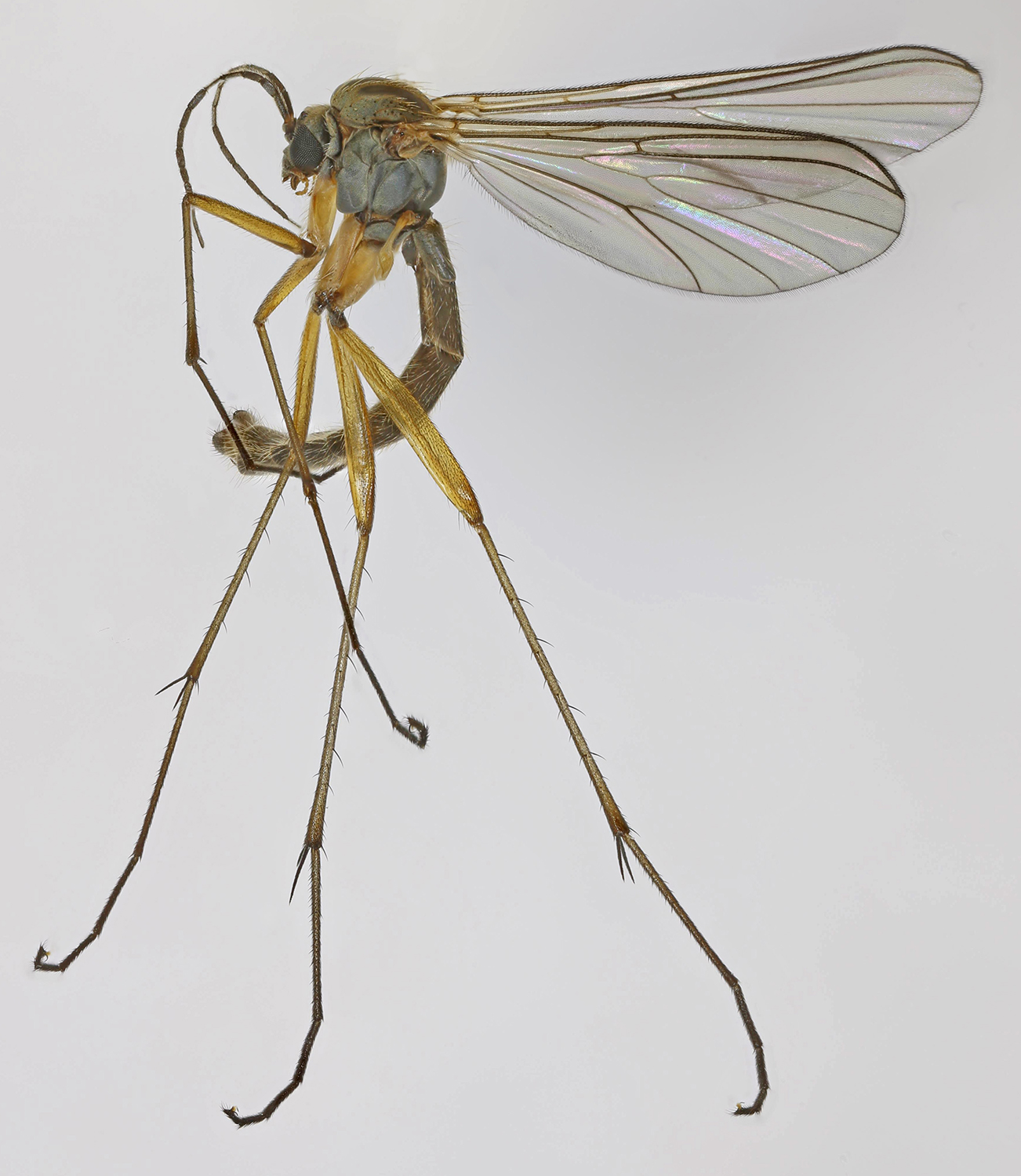
- Boletina trivittata North Wales

Scientific classification
- Kingdom: Animalia
- Phylum: Arthropoda
- Class: Insecta
- Order: Diptera
- Family: Mycetophilidae
- Genus: Boletina
- Species: B. trivittata

Binomial name
- Boletina trivittata (Meigen, 1818)

= Boletina trivittata =

Species of fly

Boletina trivittata is a Palearctic species of fungus gnat in the family Mycetophilidae. Members of this genus live in a wide range of habitats, from wooded streams to wetlands to open moors. Adults have been insect trapped on a variety of substrates, including rotting wood and soil litter.
