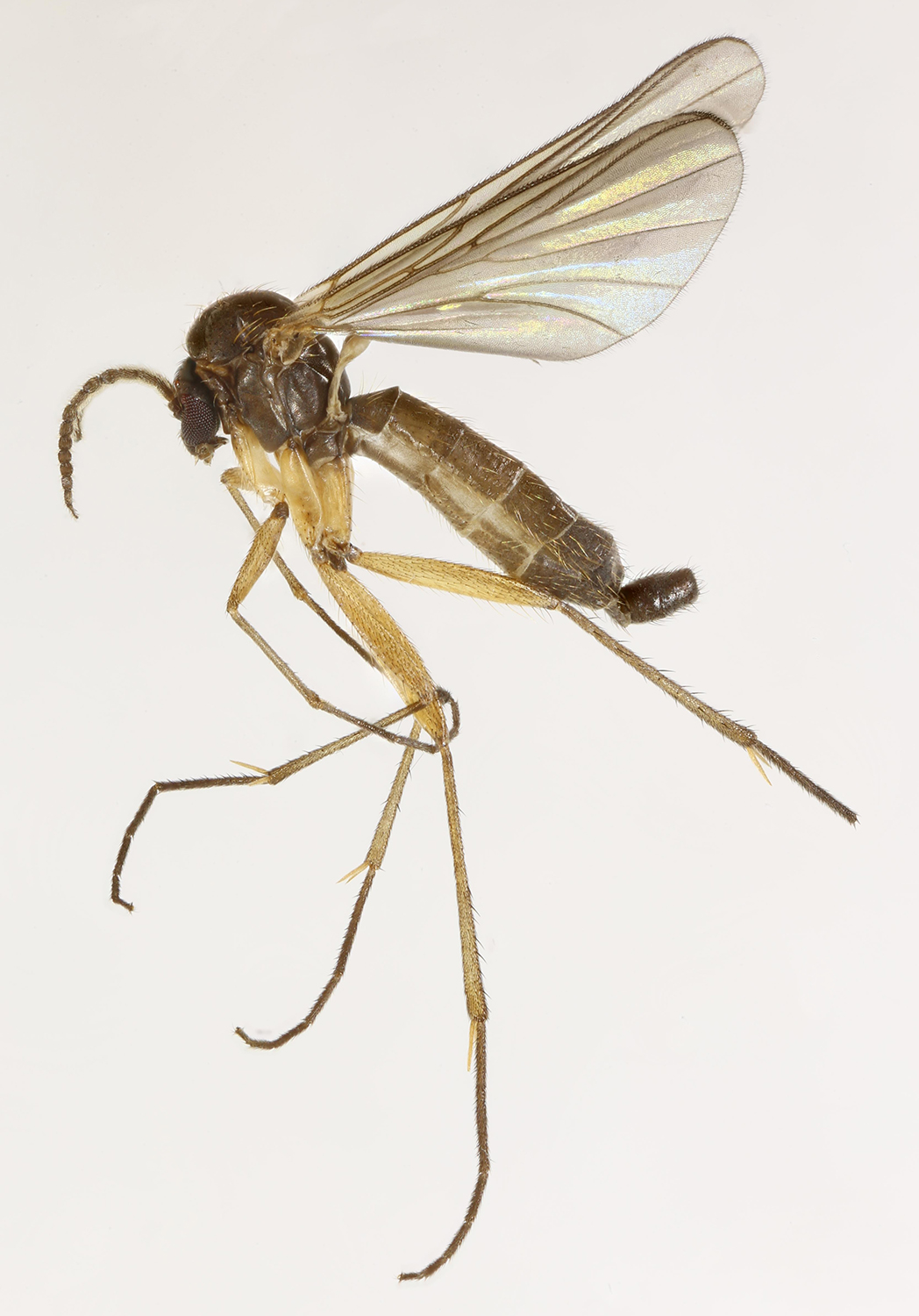
- Boletina griphoides North Wales wing length 2.5-3 mm.

Scientific classification
- Domain: Eukaryota
- Kingdom: Animalia
- Phylum: Arthropoda
- Class: Insecta
- Order: Diptera
- Family: Mycetophilidae
- Genus: Boletina
- Species: B. griphoides

Binomial name
- Boletina griphoides (Edwards, 1925)

= Boletina griphoides =

Species of fly

Boletina griphoides is a Palearctic species of 'fungus gnat' in the family Mycetophilidae. The larvae of B. griphoides are thought to be mycetophagous in the ground litter. Adults sometimes appear in enormous numbers in spring in a wide variety of habitats.

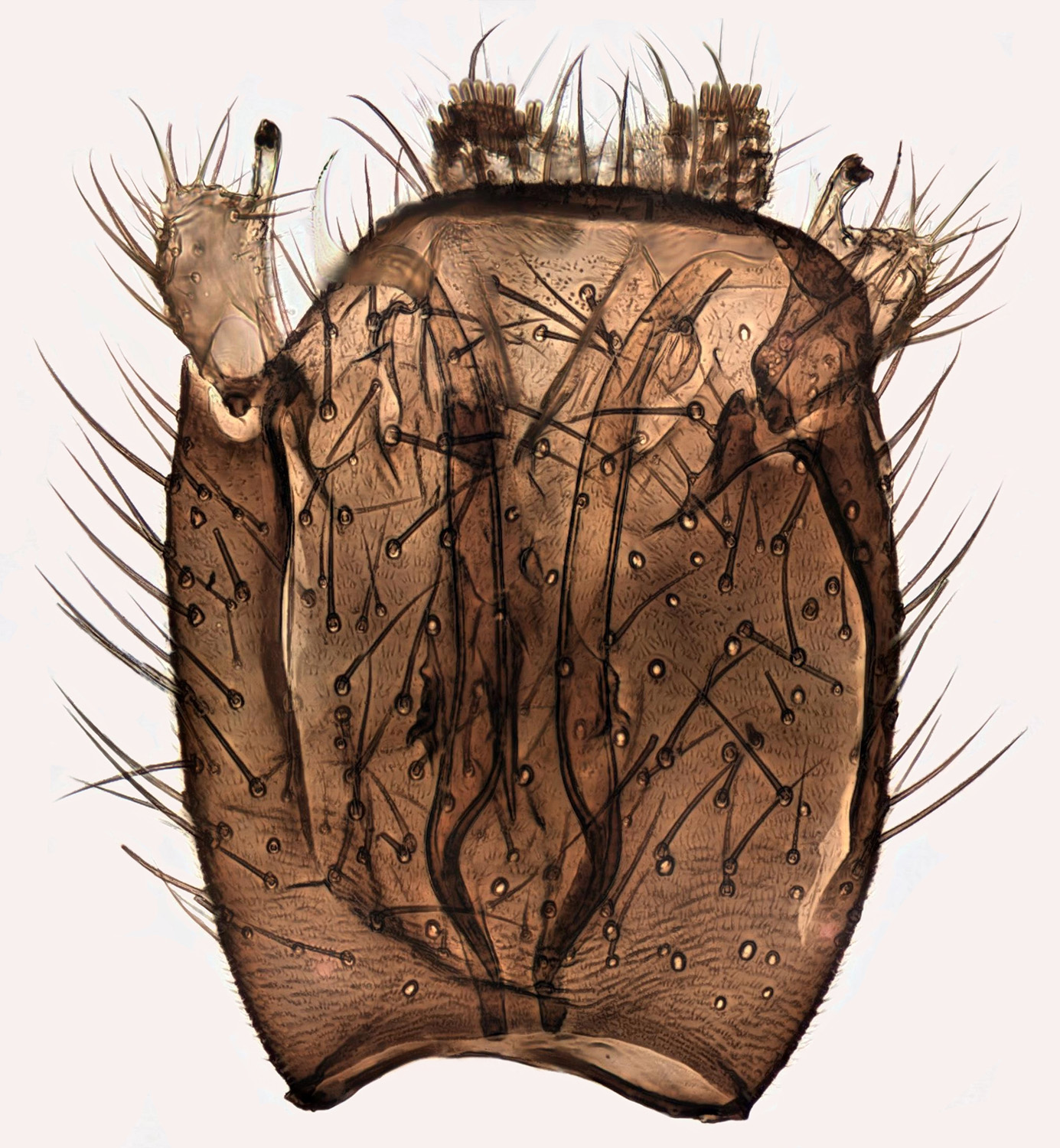
Male terminalia.

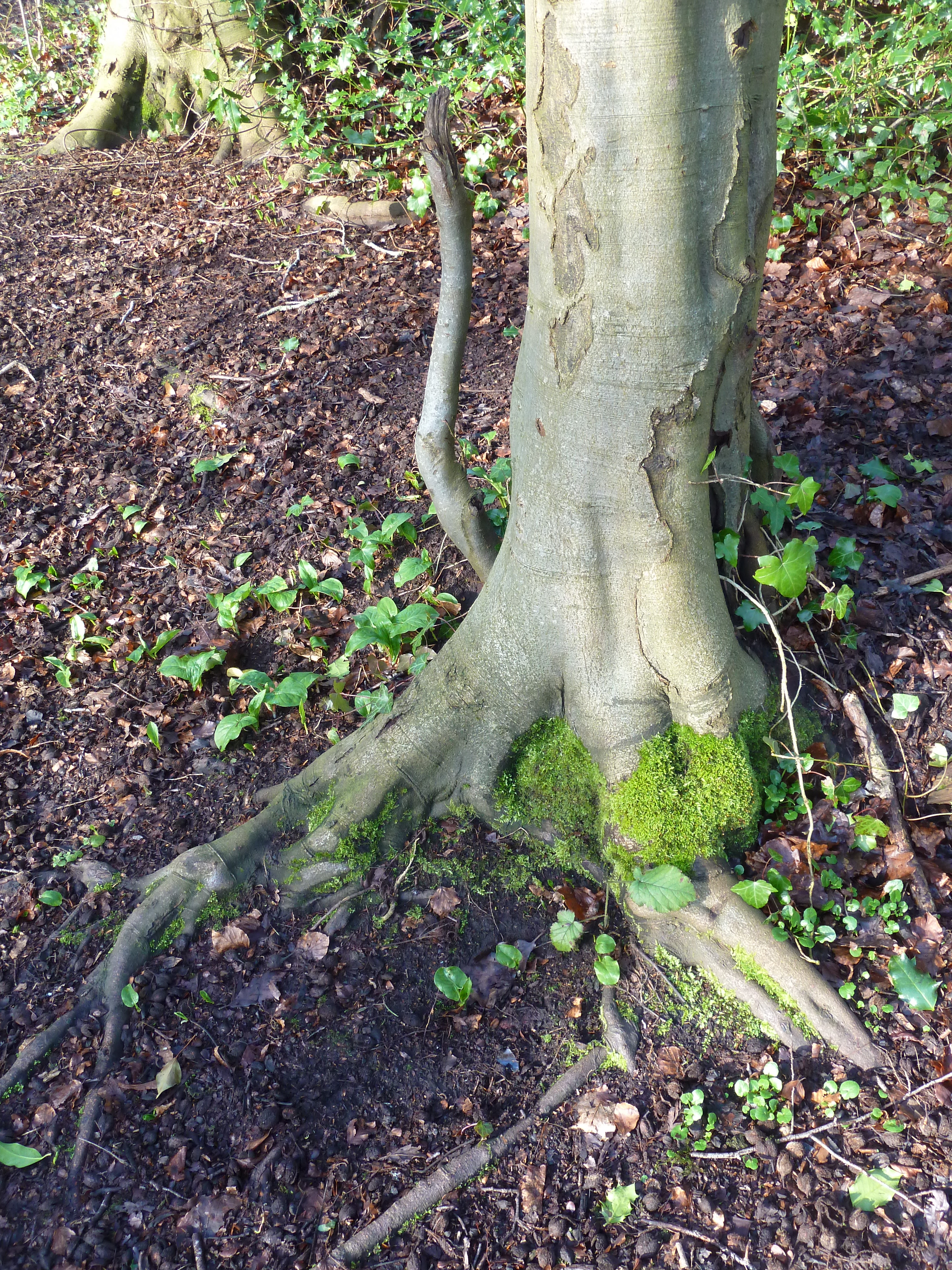
Habitat.Ireland.
