= Ectrepesthoneura laffooni =

Scientific classification
- Domain: Eukaryota
- Kingdom: Animalia
- Phylum: Arthropoda
- Class: Insecta
- Order: Diptera
- Family: Mycetophilidae
- Subfamily: Gnoristinae
- Genus: Ectrepesthoneura
- Species: E. laffooni

Binomial name
- Ectrepesthoneura laffooni Chandler, 1980

Species of fly

Ectrepesthoneura laffooni is a species of fungus gnats in the family Mycetophilidae.
