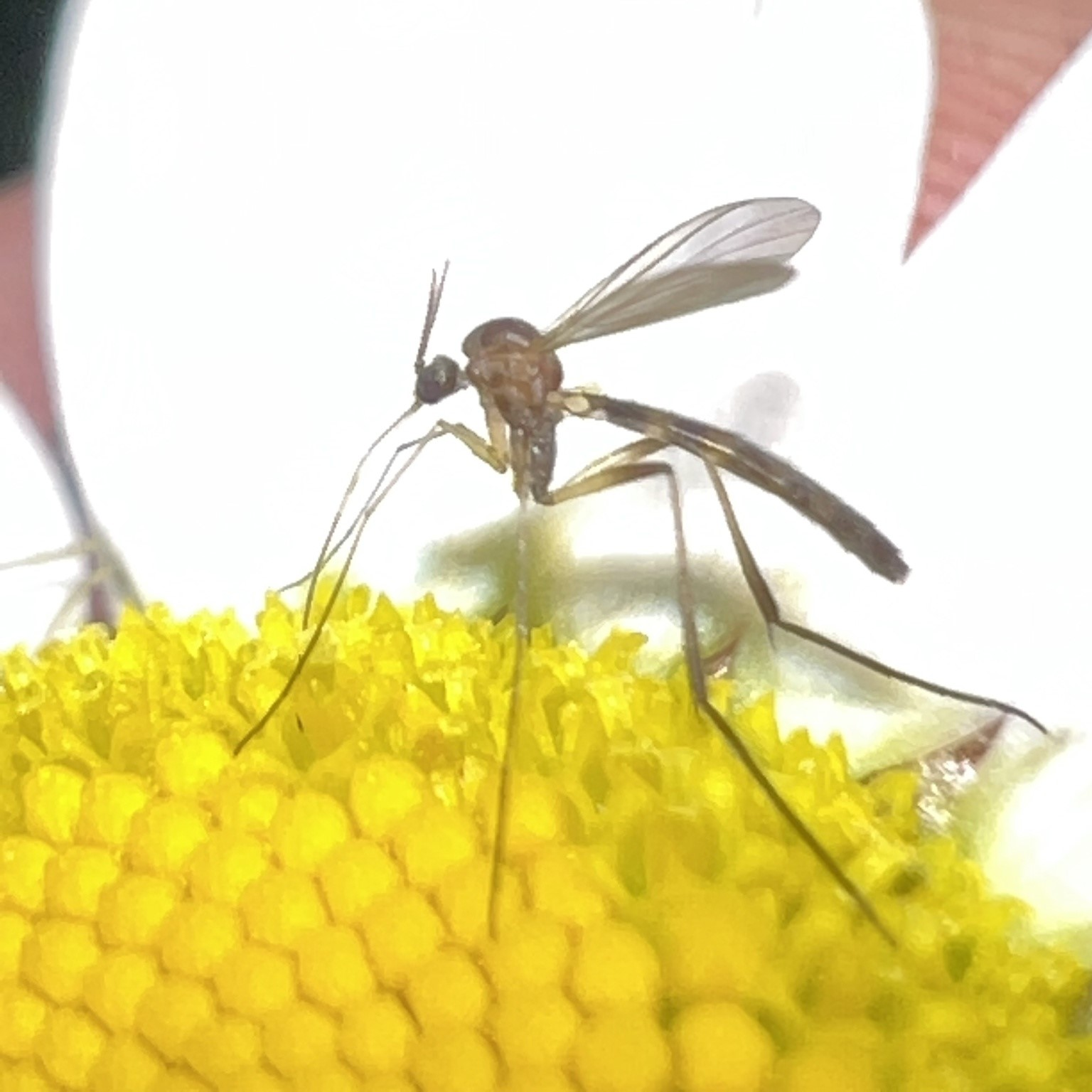

Scientific classification
- Domain: Eukaryota
- Kingdom: Animalia
- Phylum: Arthropoda
- Class: Insecta
- Order: Diptera
- Family: Mycetophilidae
- Subfamily: Gnoristinae
- Genus: Gnoriste
- Species: G. megarrhina

Binomial name
- Gnoriste megarrhina Osten Sacken, 1877

= Gnoriste megarrhina =

Species of fly

Gnoriste megarrhina is a species of fungus gnats in the family Mycetophilidae.
