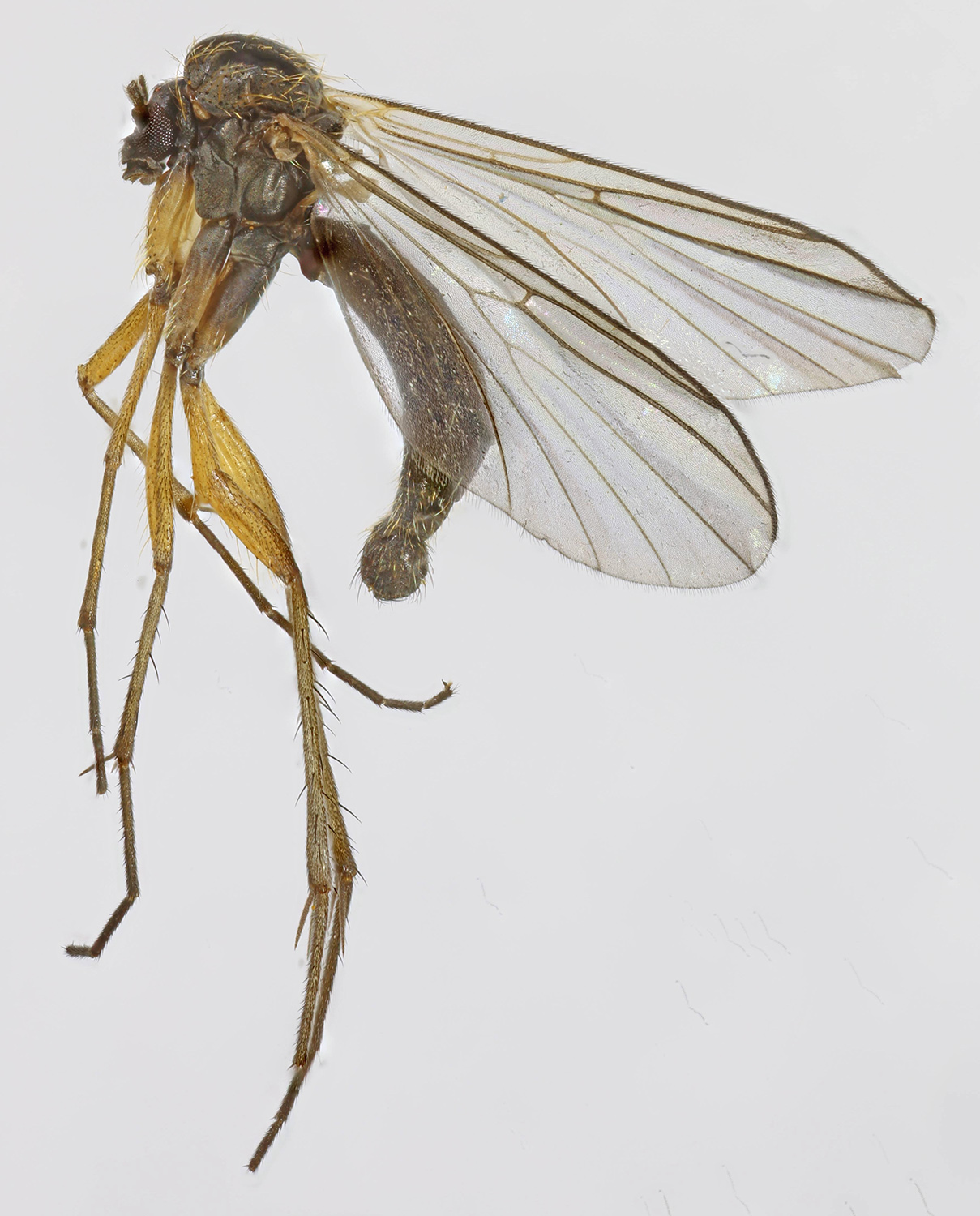
- Boletina trispinosa North Wales

Scientific classification
- Domain: Eukaryota
- Kingdom: Animalia
- Phylum: Arthropoda
- Class: Insecta
- Order: Diptera
- Family: Mycetophilidae
- Genus: Boletina
- Species: B. trispinosa

Binomial name
- Boletina trispinosa (Edwards, 1913)

= Boletina trispinosa =

Species of fly

Boletina trispinosa is a Palearctic species of 'fungus gnat' in the family Mycetophilidae. Members of this genus are found in a wider variety of habitats from wooded streams to wetlands and open moorland. They make use of diverse breeding sites from the more normal habitat of rotting wood to mosses and liverworts. The breeding biology of most species is largely unknown.

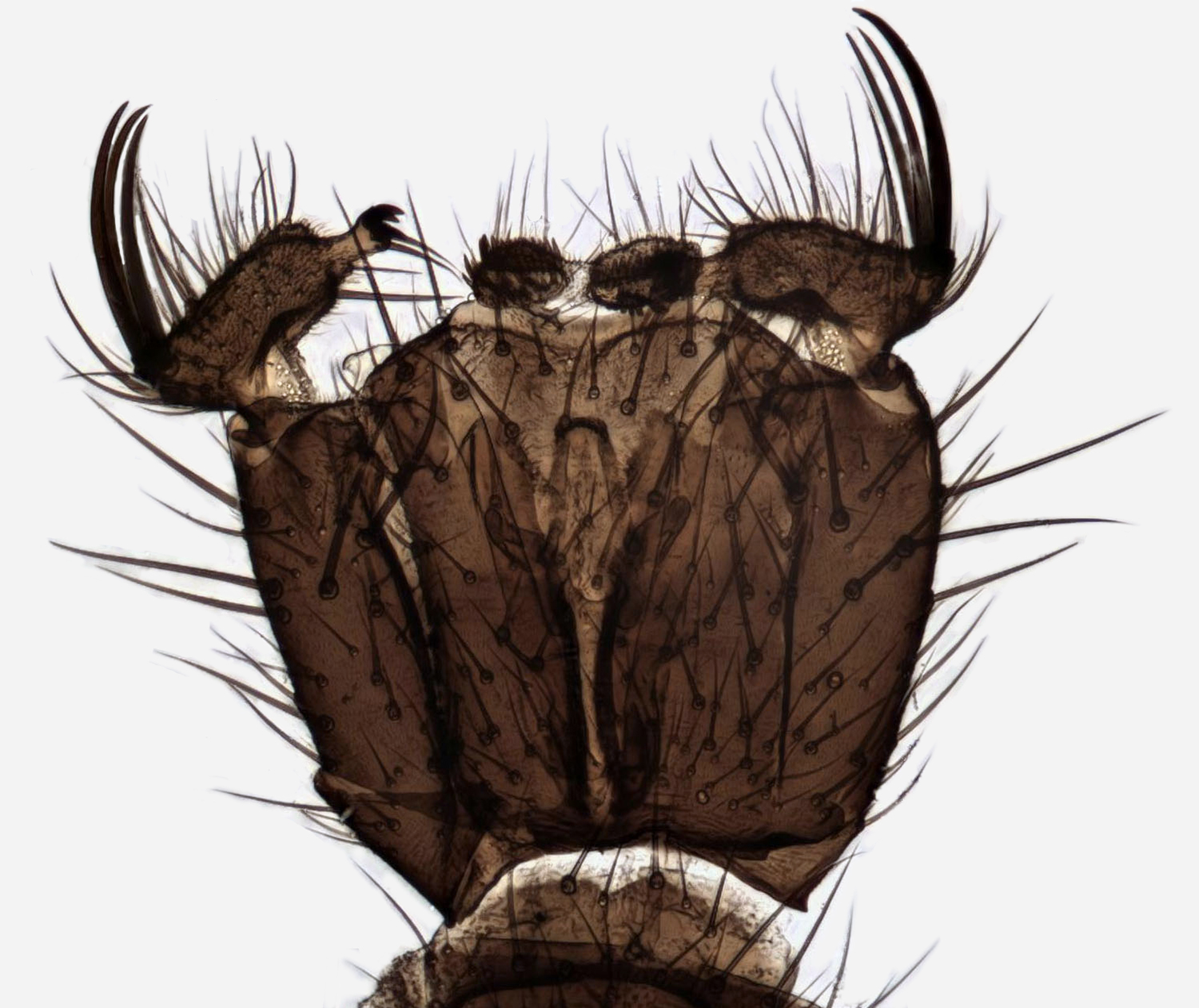
Male genitalia

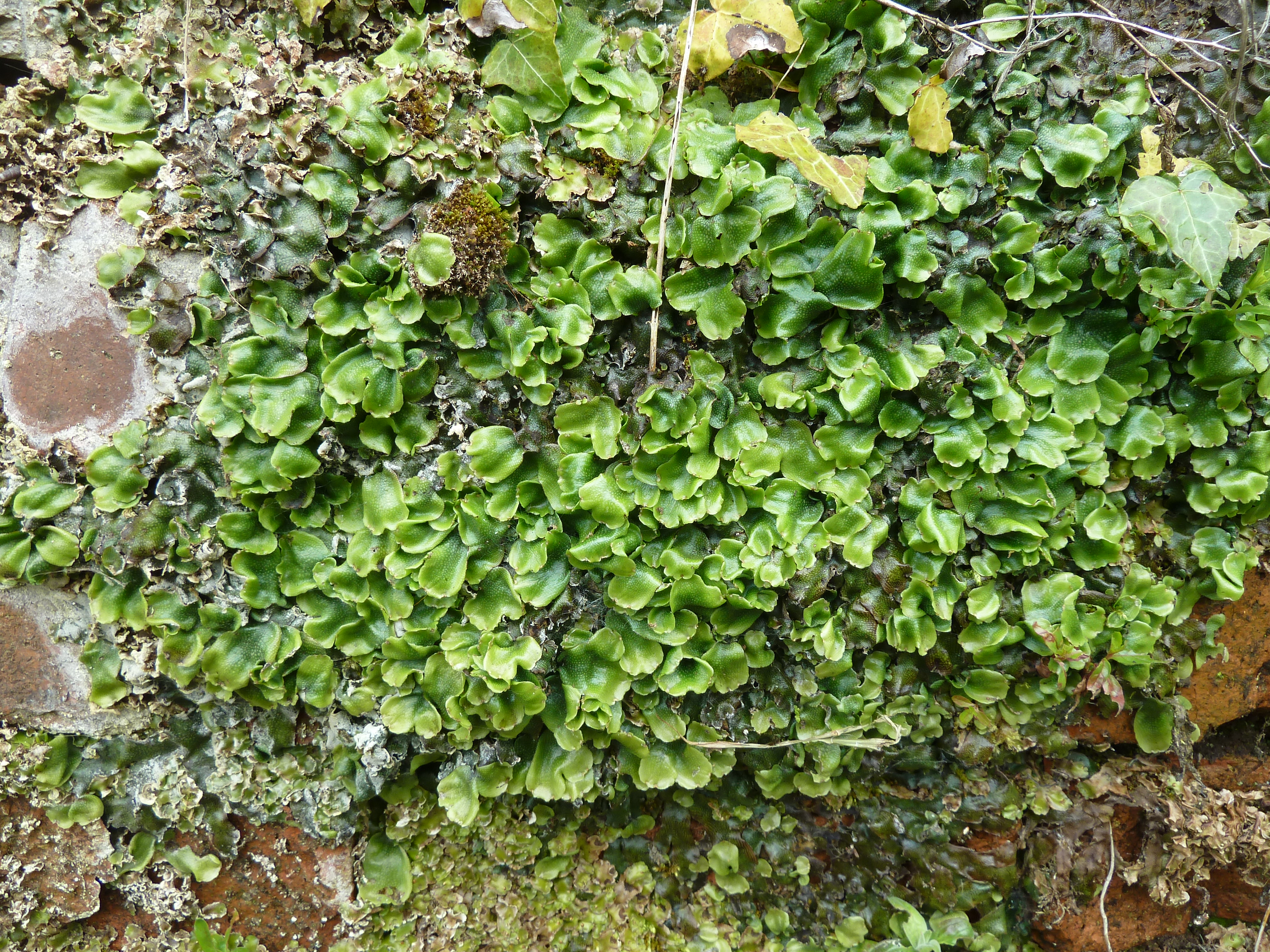
Microhabitat, Northern Ireland
