= Ectrepesthoneura =

Scientific classification
- Kingdom: Animalia
- Phylum: Arthropoda
- Clade: Pancrustacea
- Class: Insecta
- Order: Diptera
- Family: Mycetophilidae
- Subfamily: Gnoristinae
- Genus: Ectrepesthoneura; Enderlein, 1911

Genus of flies

Ectrepesthoneura is a genus of fungus gnats in the family Mycetophilidae. There are more than 20 described species in Ectrepesthoneura.

== Species ==
These 23 species belong to the genus Ectrepesthoneura:

- E. bicolor (Coquillett, 1901)
- E. bucera Plassmann, 1980
- E. canadensis Zaitzev, 1993
- E. chandleri Caspers, 1991
- E. colyeri Chandler, 1980
- E. gracilis Edwards, 1928
- E. hirta (Winnertz, 1846)
- E. japonica Sasakawa, 1961
- E. laffooni Chandler, 1980
- E. ledenikiensis Bechev, 1988
- E. marceda Sherman, 1921
- E. mikolajczyki Klimont & Krzeminska, 2016
- E. montana Zaitzev, 1984
- E. nigra Zaitzev, 1984
- E. ovata Ostroverkhova, 1977
- E. pubescens (Zetterstedt, 1860)
- E. referta Plassmann, 1976
- E. tori Zaitzev & Okland, 1994
- E. yasamatsui Sasakawa, 1961
- †E. rottensis Statz, 1944
- †E. succinimontana Blagoderov & Grimaldi, 2004
- †E. swolenskyi Blagoderov & Grimaldi, 2004
- †W. magnifica (Meunier, 1904)
