= Gnoriste =

Scientific classification
- Domain: Eukaryota
- Kingdom: Animalia
- Phylum: Arthropoda
- Class: Insecta
- Order: Diptera
- Superfamily: Sciaroidea
- Family: Mycetophilidae
- Subfamily: Gnoristinae
- Genus: Gnoriste; Meigen, 1818

Genus of flies

Gnoriste is a genus of fungus gnats in the family Mycetophilidae. There are about 13 described species in Gnoriste.

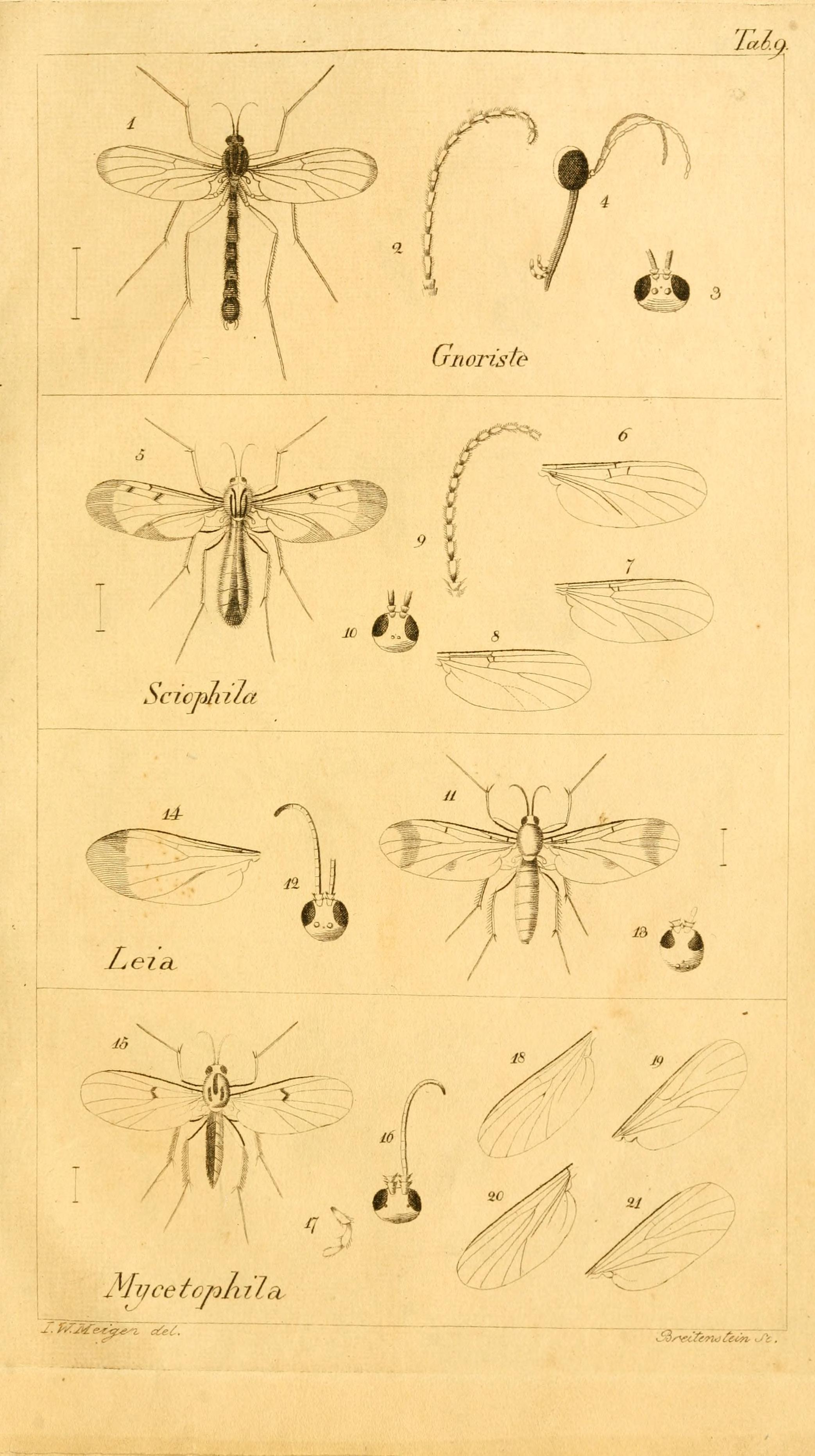
'Gnoriste in Systematische Beschreibung der bekannten europäischen zweiflügeligen Insekten

== Species ==
These 13 species belong to the genus Gnoriste:

- G. apicalis Meigen, 1818
- G. bilineata Zetterstedt, 1852
- G. cornuta Zaitzev, 1994
- G. groenlandica Lundbeck, 1898
- G. harcyniae von Roder, 1887
- G. longirostris Siebke, 1864
- G. macra Johannsen, 1912
- G. macroides Curran, 1927
- G. megarrhina Osten Sacken, 1877
- G. mikado Okada, 1939
- G. mongolica Plassmann & Joost, 1990
- †G. dentoni Scudder, 1877
- †M. meigeniana (Heer, 1856)
