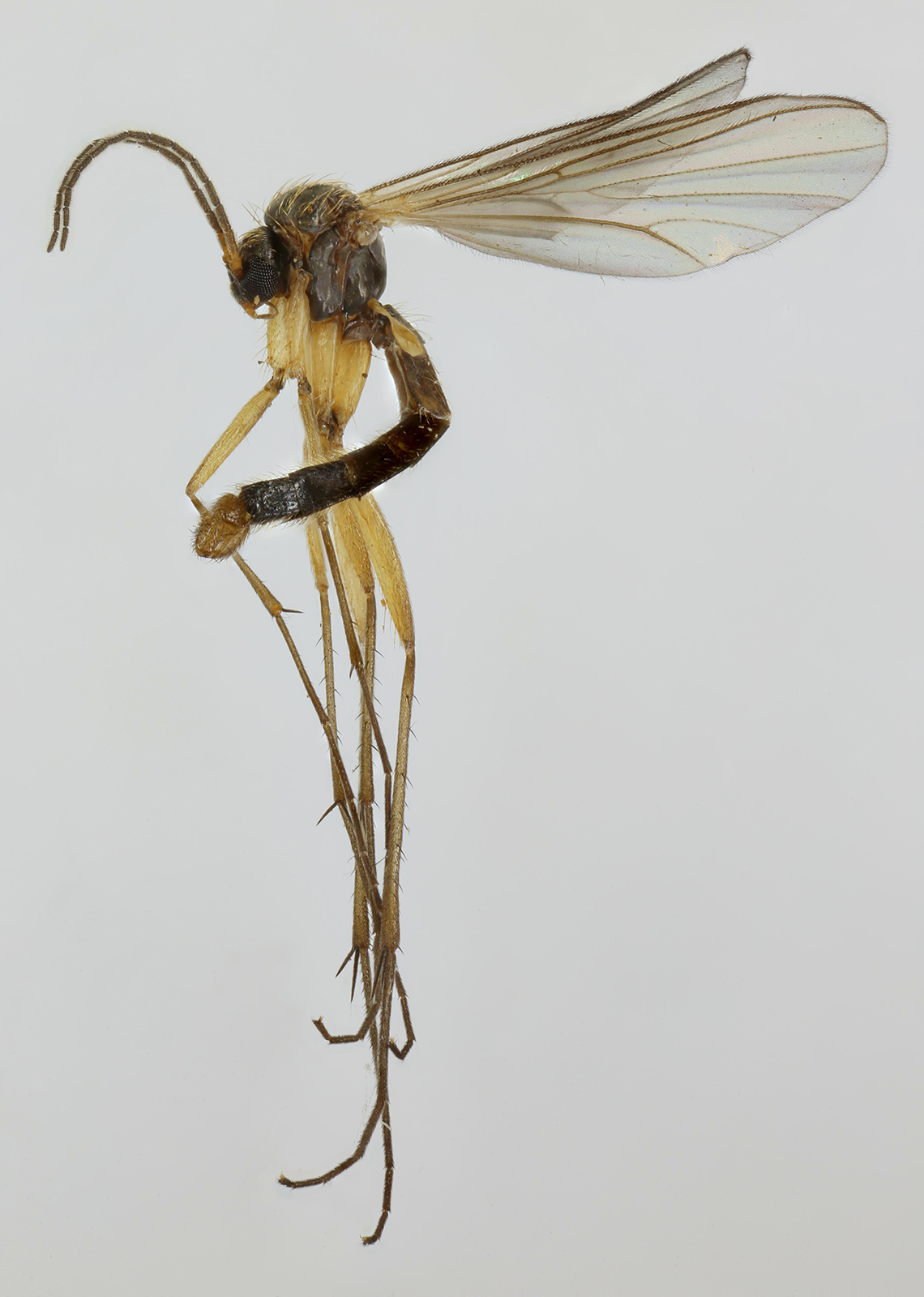
- Coelosia tenella North Wales

Scientific classification
- Domain: Eukaryota
- Kingdom: Animalia
- Phylum: Arthropoda
- Class: Insecta
- Order: Diptera
- Family: Mycetophilidae
- Genus: Coelosia
- Species: C. tenella

Binomial name
- Coelosia tenella Zetterstedt, 1852

= Coelosia tenella =

Species of fly

Coelosia tenella is a Palearctic species of 'fungus gnat' in the family Mycetophilidae. It is associated with Stereum.

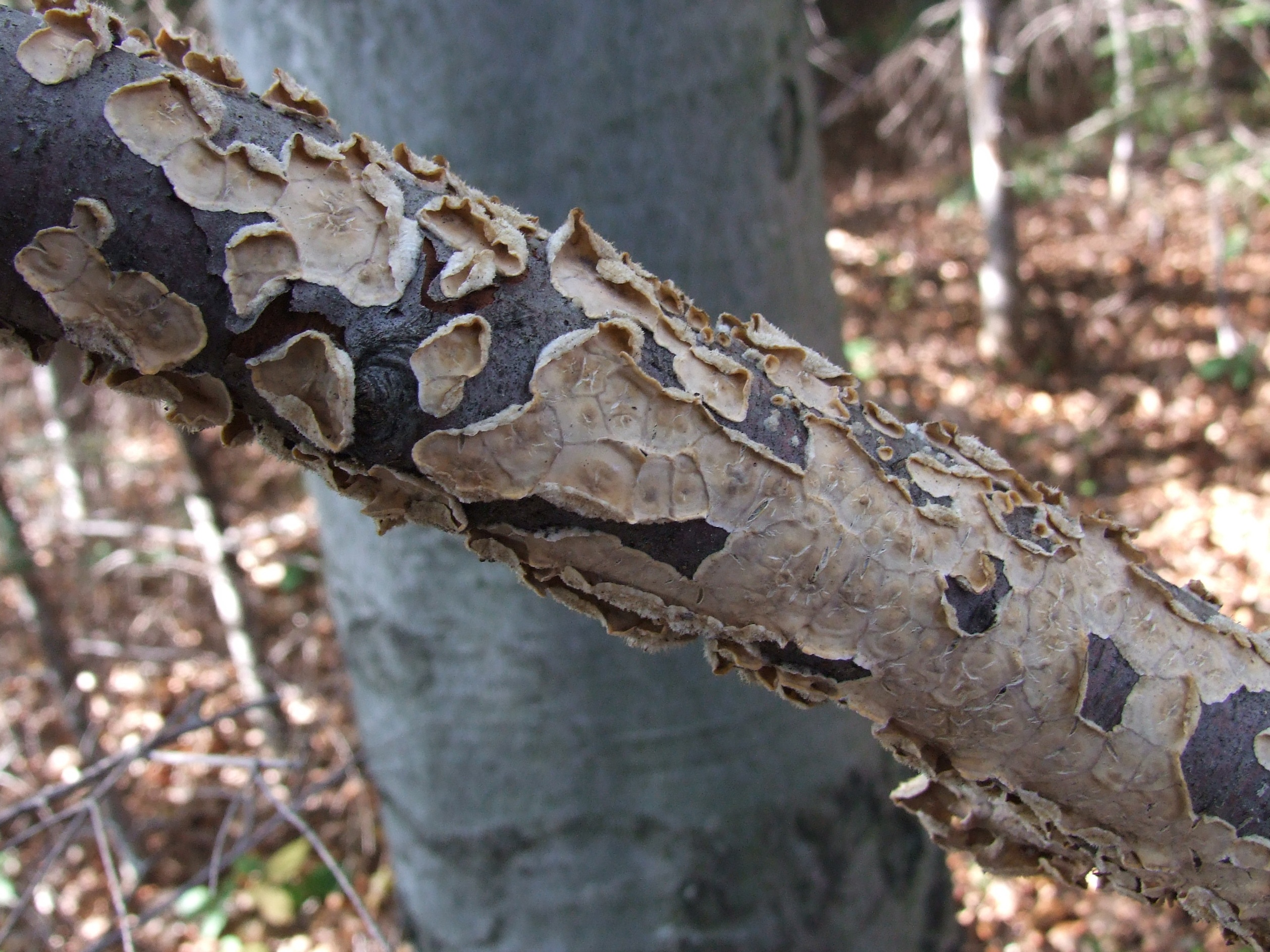
Microhabitat.
