= Aglaomyia gatineau =

Scientific classification
- Domain: Eukaryota
- Kingdom: Animalia
- Phylum: Arthropoda
- Class: Insecta
- Order: Diptera
- Family: Mycetophilidae
- Genus: Aglaomyia
- Species: A. gatineau

Binomial name
- Aglaomyia gatineau (Vockeroth, 1980)

Synonyms
- Aglamyia gatineau Vockeroth, 1980

Species of fly

Aglaomyia gatineau is a species of fungus gnats in the family Mycetophilidae.
