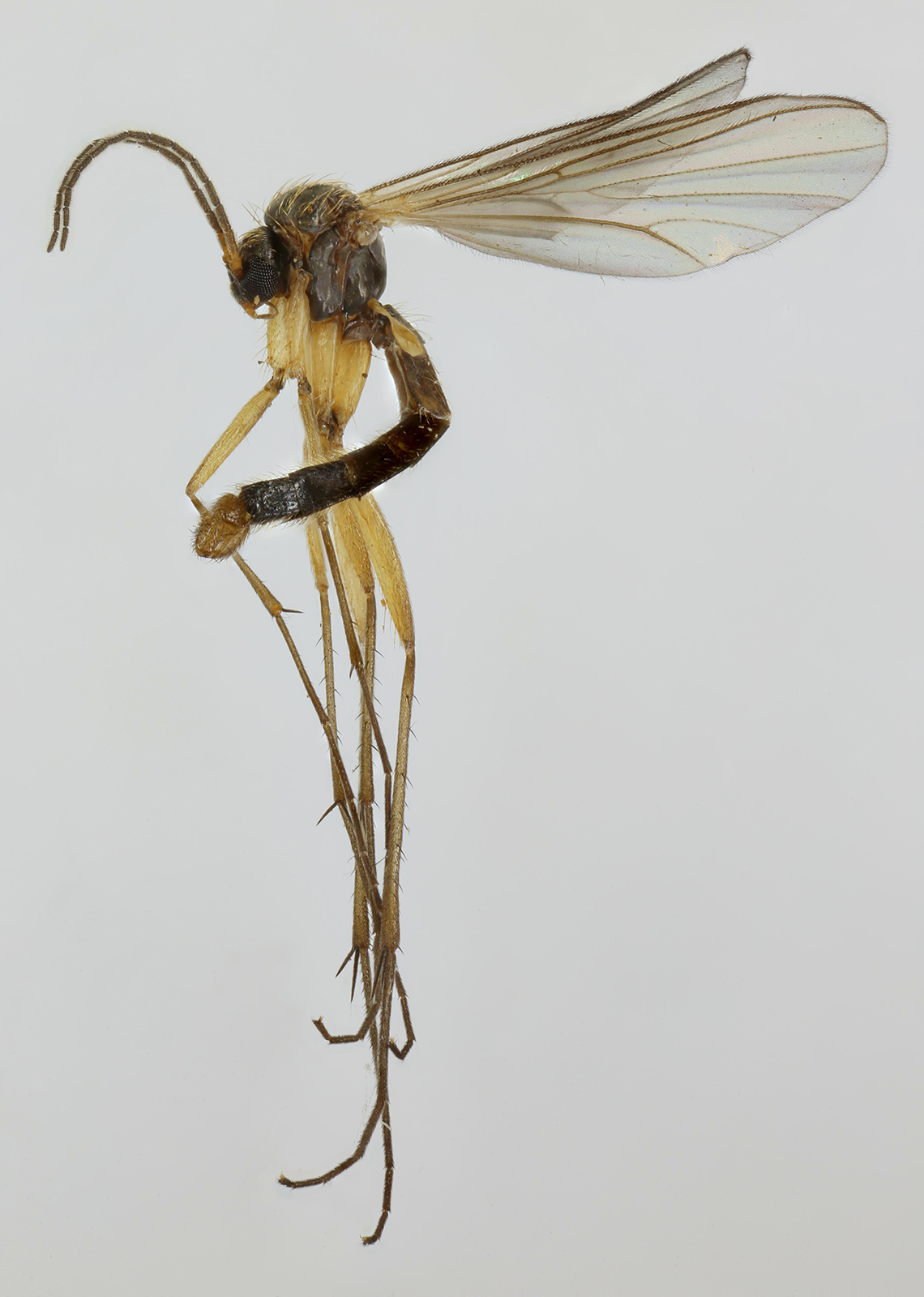
- Coelosia tenella

Scientific classification
- Domain: Eukaryota
- Kingdom: Animalia
- Phylum: Arthropoda
- Class: Insecta
- Order: Diptera
- Family: Mycetophilidae
- Subfamily: Gnoristinae
- Genus: Coelosia; Winnertz, 1863

= Coelosia =

Genus of flies

Coelosia is a genus of flies belonging to the family Mycetophilidae.

The genus was first described by Winnertz in 1863.

The genus has almost cosmopolitan distribution.

== Species ==
- Coelosia tenella (Zetterstedt, 1852)
