= Aglaomyia =

Scientific classification
- Domain: Eukaryota
- Kingdom: Animalia
- Phylum: Arthropoda
- Class: Insecta
- Order: Diptera
- Family: Mycetophilidae
- Subfamily: Gnoristinae
- Genus: Aglaomyia; Vockeroth, 1980

Synonyms
- Aglamyia Of Authors

Genus of flies

Aglaomyia is a genus of fungus gnats in the family Mycetophilidae. There are at least two described species in Aglaomyia.

== Species ==
These two species belong to the genus Aglaomyia:

- A. gatineau (Vockeroth, 1980)
- A. zhejiangensis Wu, 1995
