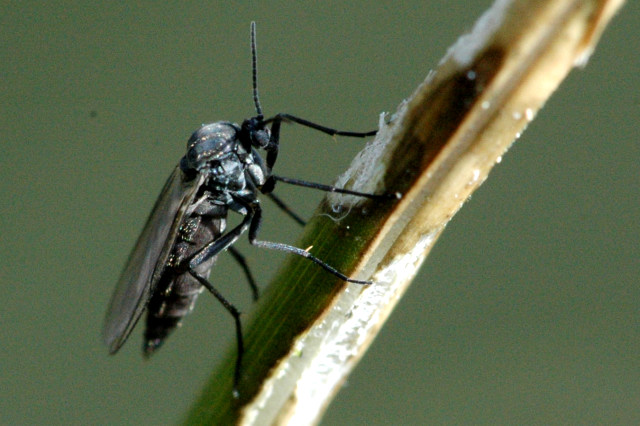
- Tetragoneura sylvatica

Scientific classification
- Kingdom: Animalia
- Phylum: Arthropoda
- Clade: Pancrustacea
- Class: Insecta
- Order: Diptera
- Family: Mycetophilidae
- Subfamily: Gnoristinae; Edwards, 1925

= Gnoristinae =

Subfamily of flies

Gnoristinae is a subfamily of fungus gnats in the family Mycetophilidae. As of 2019, there are over 442 species in the subfamily distributed more than 30 genera. The subfamily has been described as one of the most taxonomically challenging groups in Mycetophilidae, so these numbers have been subject to almost yearly change.

== Genera ==
- Acomoptera Vockeroth, 1980
- Acomopterella Zaitzev, 1989
- Aglaomyia Vockeroth, 1980
- Apolephthisa Grzegorzek, 1885
- Austrosynapha Tonnoir, 1929
- Boletina Staeger, 1840
- Chalastonepsia Søli, 1996
- Coelophthinia Edwards, 1941
- Coelosia Winnertz, 1863
- Coelosynapha Kjærandsen et al., 2020
- Creagdhubhia Chandler, 1999
- Docosia Winnertz, 1864
- Dziedzickia Johannsen, 1909
- Ectrepesthoneura Enderlein, 1911
- Gnoriste Meigen, 1818
- Grzegorzekia Edwards, 1941
- Hadroneura Lundstrom, 1906
- Katatopygia Martinsson & Kjaerandsen, 2012
- Loicia Vockeroth, 1980
- Megophthalmidia Dziedzicki, 1889
- Metanepsia Edwards, 1927
- Palaeodocosia Meunier, 1904
- Paratinia Mik, 1874
- Saigusaia Vockeroth, 1980
- Schnusea Edwards, 1933
- Speolepta Edwards, 1925
- Synapha Meigen, 1818
- Syntemna Winnertz, 1863
- Tetragoneura Winnertz, 1846
