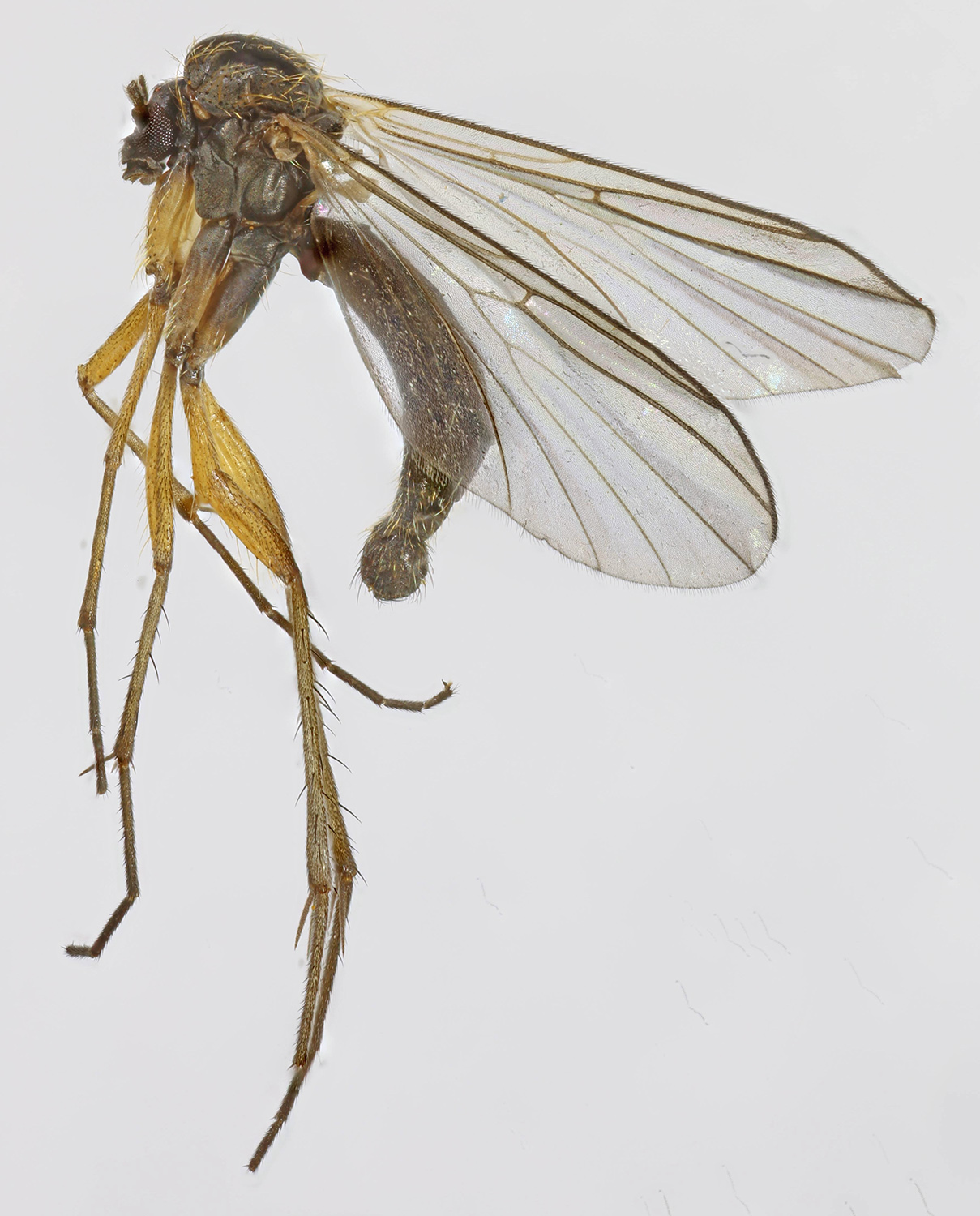
- Boletina trispinosa

Scientific classification
- Domain: Eukaryota
- Kingdom: Animalia
- Phylum: Arthropoda
- Class: Insecta
- Order: Diptera
- Superfamily: Sciaroidea
- Family: Mycetophilidae
- Subfamily: Gnoristinae
- Genus: Boletina; Stæger, 1840

= Boletina (fly) =

Genus of flies

Boletina is a genus of fungus gnats in the family Mycetophilidae. There are at least 30 described species in Boletina.

== Species ==
- B. abdominalis Adams, 1903
- B. akpatokensis Edwards, 1933
- B. antica Garrett, 1924
- B. antoma Garrett, 1924
- B. arctica Holmgren, 1872
- B. birulai Lundstrom, 1915
- B. crassicauda Van Duzee, 1928
- B. delicata Johannsen, 1912
- B. differens Garrett, 1924
- B. gracilis Johannsen, 1912
- B. groenlandica Stæger, 1845
- B. hopkinsii (Coquillett, 1895)
- B. imitator Johannsen, 1912
- B. inops Coquillett, 1900
- B. jucunda Garrett, 1924
- B. longicornis Johannsen, 1912
- B. magna Garrett, 1925
- B. melancholica Johannsen, 1912
- B. montana Garrett, 1924
- B. nacta Johannsen, 1912
- B. notescens Johannsen, 1912
- B. obesula Johannsen, 1912
- B. obscura Johannsen, 1912
- B. oviducta (Garrett, 1924)
- B. profectus Shaw and Fisher, 1952
- B. punctus Garrett, 1925
- B. sciarina Stæger, 1840
- B. sedula Johannsen, 1912
- B. shermani Garrett, 1924
- B. sobria Johannsen, 1912
- B. subatra Fisher, 1938
- B. tricincta Loew, 1869
- B. unusa Garrett, 1924
