= List of Neoempheria species =

This is a list of 147 species in Neoempheria, a genus of fungus gnats in the family Mycetophilidae.

== Neoempheria species ==
- Neoempheria acracanthia Wu & Yang, 1995^{c g}
- Neoempheria amphiphaea Speiser, 1909^{c g}
- Neoempheria amurensis Zaitzev, 1994^{c g}
- Neoempheria anjouana Matile, 1979^{c g}
- Neoempheria aperta Zaitzev & Menzel, 1996^{c g}
- Neoempheria apicalis Kertesz, 1909^{c g}
- Neoempheria appendiculata Matile, 1973^{c g}
- Neoempheria balioptera (Loew, 1869)^{i c g b}
- Neoempheria basalis (Brunetti, 1912)^{c g}
- Neoempheria beijingana Wu & Yang, 1993^{c g}
- Neoempheria biceltisuta ^{g}
- Neoempheria bidentata Coher, 1959^{c g}
- Neoempheria bifascipennis (Brunetti, 1912)^{c g}
- Neoempheria bifida Coher, 1959^{c g}
- Neoempheria biflagellata Edwards, 1940^{c g}
- Neoempheria bifurcata ^{g}
- Neoempheria bilobata Edwards, 1940^{c g}
- Neoempheria bimaculata (Roser, 1840)^{c g}
- Neoempheria bipectinata Edwards, 1940^{c g}
- Neoempheria bisecuriata ^{g}
- Neoempheria bispinosa Sasakawa, 2005^{c g}
- Neoempheria borgmeieri Edwards, 1940^{c g}
- Neoempheria boubya Matile, 1973^{c g}
- Neoempheria bradleyi Edwards, 1940^{c g}
- Neoempheria brasiliensis Coher, 1959^{c g}
- Neoempheria brevicauda Edwards, 1940^{c g}
- Neoempheria brevilineata Okada, 1939^{c g}
- Neoempheria brevispathulata ^{g}
- Neoempheria carinata ^{g}
- Neoempheria caudalis (Edwards, 1931)^{c g}
- Neoempheria cincta Shaw, 1940^{c g}
- Neoempheria comes Coher, 1959^{c g}
- Neoempheria costalimai Edwards, 1940^{c g}
- Neoempheria costaricensis Coher, 1959^{c g}
- Neoempheria cotyla Sasakawa, 2005^{c g}
- Neoempheria cuneata ^{g}
- Neoempheria cyphia Wu & Yang, 1995^{c g}
- Neoempheria defectiva (Edwards, 1931)^{c g}
- Neoempheria defleta Coher, 1959^{c g}
- Neoempheria denticulata ^{g}
- Neoempheria didyma Loew, 1869^{i c g}
- Neoempheria dilatata ^{g}
- Neoempheria dizonalis (Edwards, 1931)^{c g}
- Neoempheria donskoffi Matile, 1973^{c g}
- Neoempheria dziedzickii Coher, 1959^{c g}
- Neoempheria echinata Wu & Yang, 1995^{c g}
- Neoempheria ecuadorensis Coher, 1959^{c g}
- Neoempheria ediya Matile, 1973^{c g}
- Neoempheria enderleini Edwards, 1940^{c g}
- Neoempheria evanescens Enderlein, 1910^{c g}
- Neoempheria faceta Coher, 1959^{c g}
- Neoempheria fallax Coher, 1959^{c g}
- Neoempheria ferruginea (Brunetti, 1912)^{c}
- Neoempheria flavicornis Edwards, 1940^{c g}
- Neoempheria flavicoxa Edwards, 1940^{c g}
- Neoempheria flavida Matile, 1973^{c g}
- Neoempheria forficulata ^{g}
- Neoempheria formosensis Lynch Arribalzaga, 1892^{c g}
- Neoempheria fujiana Yang & Wu, 1991^{c g}
- Neoempheria gainesvillensis Khalaf, 1971^{i c g}
- Neoempheria glochis Coher, 1959^{c g}
- Neoempheria goiana Coher, 1959^{c g}
- Neoempheria griseipennis Strobl, 1910^{c g}
- Neoempheria horrens Coher, 1959^{c g}
- Neoempheria illustris Johannsen, 1910^{i c g b}
- Neoempheria impatiens Johannsen, 1910^{i c g}
- Neoempheria indulgens Johannsen, 1910^{i c g}
- Neoempheria insignis (Winnertz, 1863)^{c g}
- Neoempheria jamaicensis Coher, 1961^{c g}
- Neoempheria jeanneli Edwards, 1914^{c g}
- Neoempheria jilinana Wu & Yang, 1993^{c g}
- Neoempheria johannseni (Enderlein, 1910)^{c g}
- Neoempheria jugalis Coher, 1959^{c g}
- Neoempheria kaestneri Edwards, 1940^{c g}
- Neoempheria lanei Edwards, 1940^{c g}
- Neoempheria larifuga Coher, 1959^{c g}
- Neoempheria latisternata ^{g}
- Neoempheria levir Coher, 1959^{c g}
- Neoempheria lindneri Edwards, 1940^{c g}
- Neoempheria lineola (Meigen, 1818)^{c g}
- Neoempheria longiseta Coher, 1959^{c g}
- Neoempheria luederwaldti Edwards, 1940^{c g}
- Neoempheria lutzi Edwards, 1940^{c g}
- Neoempheria macularis Johannsen, 1910^{i c g b}
- Neoempheria maculipennis Williston, 1896^{c g}
- Neoempheria magna Wu & Yang, 1993^{c g}
- Neoempheria medialis (Edwards, 1931)^{c g}
- Neoempheria merogena Yang & Wu, 1993^{c g}
- Neoempheria mirabila Wu & Yang, 1995^{c g}
- Neoempheria moheliana Matile, 1979^{c g}
- Neoempheria monticola Wu, 1999^{c g}
- Neoempheria muelleri Edwards, 1940^{c g}
- Neoempheria muticata ^{g}
- Neoempheria neivai Edwards, 1940^{c g}
- Neoempheria nepticula (Loew, 1869)^{i c g}
- Neoempheria ombrophila Matile & Delobel, 1976^{c g}
- Neoempheria ornata Okada, 1938^{c g}
- Neoempheria ornatipennis (Enderlein, 1910)^{c g}
- Neoempheria panamensis Coher, 1959^{c g}
- Neoempheria paulensis Coher, 1959^{c g}
- Neoempheria pereirai Edwards, 1940^{c g}
- Neoempheria pervulgata Wu, 1995^{c g}
- Neoempheria philipsi Shaw, 1951^{c g}
- Neoempheria pictipennis (Haliday, 1833)^{c g}
- Neoempheria pilosa Edwards, 1940^{c g}
- Neoempheria platycera Wu, 1995^{c g}
- Neoempheria plaumanni Edwards, 1940^{c g}
- Neoempheria pleurotivora Sasakawa, 1979^{c g}
- Neoempheria portoricensis Coher, 1959^{c g}
- Neoempheria propinqua (Meijere, 1907)^{c g}
- Neoempheria proxima (Winnertz, 1863)^{c g}
- Neoempheria puncticoxa Edwards, 1940^{c g}
- Neoempheria rabelloi Coher, 1959^{c g}
- Neoempheria rostrata Edwards, 1940^{c g}
- Neoempheria sakhalinensis Zaitzev, 2001^{c g}
- Neoempheria separata Coher, 1959^{c g}
- Neoempheria setulosa Wu, 1999^{c g}
- Neoempheria shannoni Edwards, 1940^{c g}
- Neoempheria signifera Skuse, 1890^{c g}
- Neoempheria simplex Edwards, 1940^{c g}
- Neoempheria sinica Wu & Yang, 1993^{c g}
- Neoempheria smarti Edwards, 1940^{c g}
- Neoempheria socia Coher, 1959^{c g}
- Neoempheria spinosa Edwards, 1940^{c g}
- Neoempheria striata (Meigen, 1818)^{c g}
- Neoempheria stubbsi Sevcik & Papp, 2003^{c g}
- Neoempheria subclavata Edwards, 1940^{c g}
- Neoempheria subfallax Coher, 1959^{c g}
- Neoempheria subhorrens Coher, 1959^{c g}
- Neoempheria sublevir Coher, 1959^{c g}
- Neoempheria subproxima Zaitzev, 2001^{c g}
- Neoempheria subulata Wu & Yang, 1995^{c g}
- Neoempheria tarsata (Winnertz, 1863)^{c g}
- Neoempheria tetraphaea Shaw, 1940^{c g}
- Neoempheria tinctipennis (Brunetti, 1912)^{c g}
- Neoempheria transvaalensis Vaisanen, 1994^{c g}
- Neoempheria triloba Wu & Yang, 1995^{c g}
- Neoempheria tropica (Doleschall, 1857)^{c g}
- Neoempheria tuomikoskii Vaisanen, 1982^{c g}
- Neoempheria unifascipennis (Senior-White, 1922)^{c g}
- Neoempheria unispinosa Edwards, 1940^{c g}
- Neoempheria varipennis Lynch Arribalzaga, 1892^{c g}
- Neoempheria vicina Colless, 1966^{c g}
- Neoempheria vogeli Edwards, 1940^{c g}
- Neoempheria wangi Yang & Wu, 1993^{c g}
- Neoempheria winnertzi Edwards, 1913^{c g}
- Neoempheria zeteki Coher, 1959^{c g}

Data sources: i = ITIS, c = Catalogue of Life, g = GBIF, b = Bugguide.net
