= List of Mycomya species =

This is a list of 402 species in Mycomya, a genus of fungus gnats in the family Mycetophilidae.

== Mycomya species ==
- Mycomya abegena Vaisanen, 1984^{i c g}
- Mycomya accrescens Vaisanen, 1984^{i c g}
- Mycomya aequa Plassmann, 1987^{c g}
- Mycomya aestiva (Wulp, 1877)^{c g}
- Mycomya affinis Staeger, 1840^{i c}
- Mycomya alexanderi Coher, 1950^{c g}
- Mycomya alluaudi Edwards, 1914^{c g}
- Mycomya alpina Matile, 1972^{c g}
- Mycomya altaica Vaisanen, 1984^{c g}
- Mycomya alticola ^{g}
- Mycomya aluco Vaisanen, 1984^{i c g}
- Mycomya amgulata (Adams, 1903)^{i c g}
- Mycomya amica Vaisanen, 1984^{i c g}
- Mycomya ampla Garrett, 1924^{i c g}
- Mycomya amurensis Vaisanen, 1984^{c g}
- Mycomya andreinii (Bezzi, 1906)^{c g}
- Mycomya aneura Vaisanen, 1984^{i c g}
- Mycomya anneliae Vaisanen, 1996^{c g}
- Mycomya annulata (Meigen, 1818)^{c g}
- Mycomya ansata Freeman, 1951^{c g}
- Mycomya aonyx ^{g}
- Mycomya apoensis ^{g}
- Mycomya arcuata Vaisanen, 1984^{i c g}
- Mycomya arethusa Coher, 1952^{c g}
- Mycomya arnaudi Vaisanen, 1984^{i c g}
- Mycomya ata Garrett, 1924^{i c g}
- Mycomya aureola Wu, 1995^{c g}
- Mycomya austrobliqua Coher, 1959^{c g}
- Mycomya autumnalis Garrett, 1924^{i c g}
- Mycomya avala Vaisanen, 1984^{c g}
- Mycomya banteng ^{g}
- Mycomya baotianmana Wu, Zheng & Xu, 2001^{c g}
- Mycomya basinerva Freeman, 1951^{c g}
- Mycomya bequaerti Coher, 1950^{c g}
- Mycomya bialorussica Landrock, 1925^{g}
- Mycomya bialourssica (Landrock, 1925)^{c g}
- Mycomya bicolor (Dziedzicki, 1885)^{i c g}
- Mycomya bifida Freeman, 1951^{c g}
- Mycomya binturong Vaisanen, 1996^{c g}
- Mycomya biseriata (Loew, 1869)^{i c g}
- Mycomya bisulca (Lackschewitz, 1937)^{c g}
- Mycomya boracensis Coher, 1959^{c g}
- Mycomya borinquensis Coher, 1959^{c g}
- Mycomya bowiei Omad, Pessacq & Anjos-Santos, 2017^{g}
- Mycomya branderi Vaisanen, 1984^{c g}
- Mycomya brevifurcata Enderlein, 1910^{c g}
- Mycomya breviseta Vaisanen, 1984^{c g}
- Mycomya britteni Kidd, 1955^{g}
- Mycomya brontes Coher, 1952^{c g}
- Mycomya brunnea (Dziedzicki, 1885)^{c g}
- Mycomya bryanti Vaisanen, 1984^{i c g}
- Mycomya byersi Vaisanen, 1984^{i c g}
- Mycomya calcarata (Coquillett, 1904)^{i c g}
- Mycomya campestra Coher, 1959^{c g}
- Mycomya canariornata Chandler & Ribeiro, 1995^{c g}
- Mycomya canoak Vaisanen, 1984^{i c g}
- Mycomya capra Vaisanen, 1996^{c g}
- Mycomya carpinea Plassmann & Vogel, 1990^{c g}
- Mycomya carrerai Coher, 1950^{c g}
- Mycomya chemodanensis Maximova, 2001^{c g}
- Mycomya chilensis Blanchard, 1852^{c g}
- Mycomya chloratica Johannsen, 1910^{c g}
- Mycomya cinerascens (Macquart, 1826)^{i c g}
- Mycomya cingulata (Meigen, 1804)^{c g}
- Mycomya circumdata (Staeger, 1840)^{c g}
- Mycomya cissa ^{g}
- Mycomya citrina Shaw, 1940^{c g}
- Mycomya clavata (Lynch Arribalzaga, 1892)^{c g}
- Mycomya clavicera (Lundstrom, 1912)^{c g}
- Mycomya cleta Coher, 1952^{c g}
- Mycomya coeles Chandler, 1994^{c g}
- Mycomya collini (Edwards, 1941)^{c g}
- Mycomya comesa Vaisanen, 1984^{i c g}
- Mycomya confusa Vaisanen, 1979^{c g}
- Mycomya connecta Coher, 1959^{c g}
- Mycomya corcyrensis (Lundstrom, 1912)^{c g}
- Mycomya coxalis Freeman, 1951^{c g}
- Mycomya cramptoni Coher, 1950^{c g}
- Mycomya cranbrooki Garrett, 1924^{i c g}
- Mycomya cuon ^{g}
- Mycomya curvata (Fisher, 1937)^{c g}
- Mycomya curvilinea Brunetti, 1912^{c g}
- Mycomya cylindrica Freeman, 1951^{c g}
- Mycomya danielae Matile, 1972^{i c g}
- Mycomya decorosa (Winnertz, 1863)^{c g}
- Mycomya denmax Vaisanen, 1979^{i c g}
- Mycomya dentata Fisher, 1937^{i c g}
- Mycomya dichaeta Fisher, 1937^{i c g b}
- Mycomya dictyophila Wu, Zheng & Xu, 2001^{c g}
- Mycomya difficilis Garrett, 1924^{i c g}
- Mycomya digitifera (Edwards, 1925)^{c g}
- Mycomya dilatata (Ostroverkhova, 1979)^{c g}
- Mycomya diluta (Zetterstedt, 1860)^{c g}
- Mycomya disa Vaisanen, 1984^{c g}
- Mycomya divisa Freeman, 1951^{c g}
- Mycomya dorsimacula Enderlein, 1910^{c g}
- Mycomya dryope Coher, 1952^{c g}
- Mycomya dryophila (Ostroverkhova, 1979)^{c g}
- Mycomya ducula ^{g}
- Mycomya dumeta Coher, 1959^{c g}
- Mycomya duplicata (Edwards, 1925)^{c g}
- Mycomya dura Garrett, 1924^{i c g}
- Mycomya dziedzicki Vaisanen, 1981^{c g}
- Mycomya echinata Garrett, 1924^{i c g}
- Mycomya edra Vaisanen, 1994^{c g}
- Mycomya edwardsi Coher, 1950^{c g}
- Mycomya egregia (Dziedzicki, 1885)^{c g}
- Mycomya electa Vaisanen, 1984^{i c g}
- Mycomya elephas Vaisanen, 1984^{i c g}
- Mycomya emotoi Vaisanen, 1996^{c g}
- Mycomya epacra Coher, 1959^{c g}
- Mycomya esox Vaisanen, 1984^{i c g}
- Mycomya excerpta Coher, 1959^{c g}
- Mycomya exigua (Winnertz, 1863)^{c g}
- Mycomya falcifera Freeman, 1951^{c g}
- Mycomya fasciata Zetterstedt^{i c g}
- Mycomya fasriata (Zetterstedt, 1838)^{i c g}
- Mycomya fenestralis (Philippi, 1865)^{c g}
- Mycomya fennica Vaisanen, 1979^{c g}
- Mycomya ferruginea (Meigen, 1818)^{c g}
- Mycomya ferrzai Coher, 1950^{c g}
- Mycomya festivalis Vaisanen, 1984^{c g}
- Mycomya fimbriata (Meigen, 1818)^{i c g}
- Mycomya fissa (Lundstrom, 1911)^{c g}
- Mycomya flabellata (Lackschewitz, 1937)^{c g}
- Mycomya flava (Winnertz, 1863)^{c g}
- Mycomya flavescens Freeman, 1951^{c g}
- Mycomya flavicollis (Zetterstedt, 1852)^{c g}
- Mycomya flavilatera Tonnoir & Edwards, 1927^{c g}
- Mycomya flaviventris Brunetti, 1912^{c g}
- Mycomya forcipata Freeman, 1951^{c g}
- Mycomya forestaria (Plassmann, 1978)^{c g}
- Mycomya fornicata (Lundstrom, 1911)^{c g}
- Mycomya fragilis (Loew, 1869)^{i c g}
- Mycomya freemani Coher, 1950^{c g}
- Mycomya frequens Johannsen, 1910^{i c g}
- Mycomya frigida (Plassmann, 1978)^{c g}
- Mycomya funebris Freeman, 1951^{c g}
- Mycomya furcata Tonnoir & Edwards, 1927^{c g}
- Mycomya fusca (Meigen, 1818)^{c g}
- Mycomya fuscata Winnertz^{i c g}
- Mycomya fuscicornis Freeman, 1951^{c g}
- Mycomya fuscipalpis Van Duzee, 1928^{i c g}
- Mycomya galeapectinata Chandler, 1994^{c g}
- Mycomya ganglioneuse Wu, Zheng & Xu, 2001^{c g}
- Mycomya geei Vaisanen, 1996^{c g}
- Mycomya gimmerthali (Landrock, 1925)^{c g}
- Mycomya goethalsi Vaisanen, 1981^{c g}
- Mycomya goral ^{g}
- Mycomya griseovittata (Zetterstedt, 1852)^{c g}
- Mycomya guandiana Wu & Yang, 1995^{c g}
- Mycomya gutianshana Wu & Yang, 1994^{c g}
- Mycomya hackmani Vaisanen, 1984^{c g}
- Mycomya hamadryas Coher, 1952^{c g}
- Mycomya hansoni Coher, 1950^{c g}
- Mycomya hebrardi (Vaisanen & Matile, 1980)^{c g}
- Mycomya helobia (Ostroverkhova, 1979)^{c g}
- Mycomya hengshana Wu & Yang, 1995^{c g}
- Mycomya heydeni (Plassmann, 1970)^{c g}
- Mycomya hians (Lundstrom, 1912)^{c g}
- Mycomya hiisi Vaisanen, 1979^{c g}
- Mycomya himiti (Vanschuytbroeck, 1965)^{c g}
- Mycomya hirticollis (Say, 1824)^{i c g}
- Mycomya humeralis (Skuse, 1890)^{c g}
- Mycomya humida Garrett, 1924^{i c g}
- Mycomya hyalinata (Meigen, 1830)^{c g}
- Mycomya hystrix Vaisanen, 1996^{c g}
- Mycomya ibex Vaisanen, 1996^{c g}
- Mycomya ikar Vaisanen, 1996^{c g}
- Mycomya imitans Johannsen, 1910^{i c g b}
- Mycomya imperatrix Vaisanen, 1984^{i c g}
- Mycomya incerta (Brunetti, 1912)^{c}
- Mycomya incisurata (Zetterstedt, 1838)^{c g}
- Mycomya indefinita Brunetti, 1912^{c g}
- Mycomya indica Brunetti, 1912^{c g}
- Mycomya indistincta Polevoi, 1995^{c g}
- Mycomya inflata (Ostroverkhova, 1979)^{c g}
- Mycomya infuscata Freeman, 1951^{c g}
- Mycomya insulana Vaisanen, 1984^{c g}
- Mycomya intermissa (Plassmann, 1984)^{c g}
- Mycomya interposita (Ostroverkhova, 1979)^{c g}
- Mycomya iphis Coher, 1952^{c g}
- Mycomya irena ^{g}
- Mycomya irene Coher, 1952^{c g}
- Mycomya islandica Vaisanen, 1984^{i c g}
- Mycomya jaffuelensis Freeman, 1951^{c g}
- Mycomya jeti ^{g}
- Mycomya kaa ^{g}
- Mycomya kambaitiensis ^{g}
- Mycomya karelica Vaisanen, 1979^{c g}
- Mycomya kaurii Vaisanen, 1984^{i c g}
- Mycomya ketupa Vaisanen, 1996^{c g}
- Mycomya kiamichii Shaw, 1940^{i c g}
- Mycomya kiboensis Lindner, 1958^{c g}
- Mycomya kingi (Edwards, 1941)^{c g}
- Mycomya klossi Edwards, 1931^{c g}
- Mycomya kurildisa Vaisanen, 1984^{c g}
- Mycomya kuusamoensis Vaisanen, 1979^{c g}
- Mycomya kyan Vaisanen, 1996^{c g}
- Mycomya lambi Edwards, 1941^{i c g}
- Mycomya lamellata Freeman, 1951^{c g}
- Mycomya lanei Coher, 1950^{c g}
- Mycomya lenticulata (Ostroverkhova, 1979)^{c g}
- Mycomya leporina Vaisanen, 1984^{i c g}
- Mycomya levis Dziedzicki^{i c g}
- Mycomya libentia Plassmann & Vogel, 1990^{c g}
- Mycomya lightfooti Edwards, 1925^{c g}
- Mycomya lindrothi (Plassmann, 1981)^{c g}
- Mycomya littoralis (Say, 1824)^{i c g}
- Mycomya livida (Dziedzicki, 1885)^{c g}
- Mycomya lividella Vaisanen, 1984^{i c g}
- Mycomya londti Vaisanen, 1994^{c g}
- Mycomya longdeana Wu & Yang, 1994^{c g}
- Mycomya longistila Freeman, 1951^{c g}
- Mycomya lutea Enderlein, 1910^{c g}
- Mycomya lutealis Vaisanen, 1984^{i c g}
- Mycomya macaca Vaisanen, 1996^{c g}
- Mycomya macateei Vaisanen, 1984^{i c g}
- Mycomya maccoyi (Skuse, 1890)^{c g}
- Mycomya maculata (Meigen, 1804)^{i c g}
- Mycomya magna Wu & Yang, 1993^{c g}
- Mycomya magnifica Vaisanen, 1984^{i c g}
- Mycomya malaisei Vaisanen, 1996^{c g}
- Mycomya malkini Vaisanen, 1983^{c g}
- Mycomya malvinensis Vogel & Plassmann, 1985^{c g}
- Mycomya manis Vaisanen, 1996^{c g}
- Mycomya manteri Coher, 1950^{c g}
- Mycomya maoershana Wu & Yang, 1994^{c g}
- Mycomya marginalis Johannsen, 1910^{i c g}
- Mycomya marginata (Meigen, 1818)^{c g}
- Mycomya marmota ^{g}
- Mycomya mathesoni Coher, 1950^{c g}
- Mycomya matilei Vaisanen, 1984^{c g}
- Mycomya matrona Vaisanen, 1984^{i c g}
- Mycomya maura (Walker, 1856)^{c g}
- Mycomya melania (Winnertz, 1863)^{c g}
- Mycomya melanoceras (Edwards, 1925)^{c g}
- Mycomya melanogaster (Zetterstedt, 1852)^{c g}
- Mycomya mendax Johannsen, 1910^{i c g}
- Mycomya meridionalis Johannsen, 1909^{c g}
- Mycomya midas Coher, 1952^{c g}
- Mycomya midea Vaisanen, 1984^{i c g}
- Mycomya minla Vaisanen, 1996^{c g}
- Mycomya minuscula Matile, 1991^{c g}
- Mycomya minutata Edwards, 1931^{c g}
- Mycomya mituda Vaisanen, 1980^{c g}
- Mycomya monosta Vaisanen, 1984^{i c g}
- Mycomya montalba Vaisanen, 1984^{i c g}
- Mycomya montforti Chandler, 1994^{c g}
- Mycomya multiseta Coher, 1959^{c g}
- Mycomya munda (Winnertz, 1863)^{c g}
- Mycomya muscovita Vaisanen, 1984^{i c g}
- Mycomya mutabilis Sherman, 1921^{i c g}
- Mycomya naja ^{g}
- Mycomya nakanishii ^{g}
- Mycomya natalensis Vaisanen, 1994^{c g}
- Mycomya nava (Plassmann, 1977)^{c g}
- Mycomya neimongana Wu, 1991^{c g}
- Mycomya neodentata Vaisanen, 1984^{c g}
- Mycomya neohyalinata Vaisanen, 1984^{i c g}
- Mycomya neolittoralis Vaisanen, 1984^{i c g}
- Mycomya nicothoe Coher, 1952^{c g}
- Mycomya nigricauda (Adams, 1903)^{i c g}
- Mycomya nigriceps (Loew, 1873)^{c g}
- Mycomya nigricornis Zetterstedt, 1852^{i c g}
- Mycomya nipalensis Vaisanen, 1996^{c g}
- Mycomya nitida (Zetterstedt, 1852)^{i c g}
- Mycomya noctivaga (Plassmann, 1972)^{c g}
- Mycomya norna Vaisanen, 1984^{c g}
- Mycomya notabilis (Staeger, 1840)^{c g}
- Mycomya notata (Zetterstedt, 1860)^{c g}
- Mycomya novagallica Vaisanen, 1984^{i c g}
- Mycomya obliqua (Say, 1824)^{i c g}
- Mycomya occultans (Winnertz, 1863)^{c g}
- Mycomya ochracea Freeman, 1951^{c g}
- Mycomya onusta (Loew, 1969)^{i c g}
- Mycomya oreades Vaisanen, 1984^{i c g}
- Mycomya ornata Meigen^{i c g}
- Mycomya ostensackeni (Vaisanen, 1984)^{i c g}
- Mycomya paguma ^{g}
- Mycomya pallens (Loew, 1873)^{c g}
- Mycomya pallida (Winnertz, 1863)^{c g}
- Mycomya panthera ^{g}
- Mycomya par (Walker, 1856)^{c g}
- Mycomya paradentata Vaisanen, 1984^{c g}
- Mycomya paradisa Wu, 1995^{c g}
- Mycomya paraklossi ^{g}
- Mycomya parva (Dziedzicki, 1885)^{c g}
- Mycomya paupercula Coher, 1959^{c g}
- Mycomya pectinata Freeman, 1951^{c g}
- Mycomya pectinifera (Edwards, 1925)^{c g}
- Mycomya penicillata (Dziedzicki, 1885)^{c g}
- Mycomya permixta Vaisanen, 1984^{c g}
- Mycomya perparva Matile, 1991^{c g}
- Mycomya peruviana Edwards, 1931^{c g}
- Mycomya pictithorax (Skuse, 1890)^{c g}
- Mycomya pini Vaisanen, 1984^{i c g}
- Mycomya pitta ^{g}
- Mycomya plagiata (Tonnoir & Edwards, 1927)^{c g}
- Mycomya polleni Garrett, 1924^{i c g}
- Mycomya pongo ^{g}
- Mycomya pontis Coher, 1959^{c g}
- Mycomya portoblest Coher, 1959^{c g}
- Mycomya praeda Vaisanen, 1984^{i c g}
- Mycomya prominens (Lundstrom, 1913)^{c g}
- Mycomya pseudoapicalis (Landrock, 1925)^{c g}
- Mycomya pseudocurvata Vaisanen, 1979^{c g}
- Mycomya pseudopulchella (Ostroverkhova, 1979)^{c g}
- Mycomya pseudoultima Zaitzev, 1994^{c g}
- Mycomya pulchella (Dziedzicki, 1885)^{c g}
- Mycomya punctata (Meigen, 1804)^{c g}
- Mycomya pura Vaisanen, 1984^{i c g}
- Mycomya pygmalion Vaisanen, 1984^{c g}
- Mycomya pyriformis Vaisanen, 1984^{i c g}
- Mycomya qingchengana Wu & Yang, 1995^{c g}
- Mycomya quadrimaculata Kerr, Thompson & Kerr, 2023^{c g}
- Mycomya ratufa ^{g}
- Mycomya rebellicosa Vaisanen, 1984^{i c g}
- Mycomya recondita (Ostroverkhova, 1979)^{c g}
- Mycomya recurva Johannsen, 1910^{i c g}
- Mycomya recurvata Wu, 1995^{c g}
- Mycomya richmondensis (Skuse, 1890)^{c g}
- Mycomya rivalis (Santos Abreu, 1920)^{c g}
- Mycomya rosalba Hutson, 1979^{c g}
- Mycomya ruficollis Zetterstedt^{i c g}
- Mycomya rufonigra Matile, 1991^{c g}
- Mycomya sachalinensis Zaitzev, 1994^{c g}
- Mycomya safena Vaisanen, 1984^{i c g}
- Mycomya saga Vaisanen, 1984^{i c g}
- Mycomya samesteri Coher, 1950^{c g}
- Mycomya schmidi Vaisanen, 1984^{c g}
- Mycomya scopula Fisher, 1937^{i c g}
- Mycomya setifera Freeman, 1951^{c g}
- Mycomya shannoni Coher, 1950^{c g}
- Mycomya shawi Coher, 1950^{c g}
- Mycomya shermani Garrett, 1924^{i c g}
- Mycomya shewelli Vaisanen, 1984^{i c g}
- Mycomya shimai ^{g}
- Mycomya siebecki (Landrock, 1912)^{c g}
- Mycomya sieberti (Landrock, 1930)^{c g}
- Mycomya sigma Johannsen, 1910^{i c g}
- Mycomya simillima Freeman, 1951^{c g}
- Mycomya simpla Coher, 1959^{c g}
- Mycomya simplex (Coquillett, 1905)^{i c g}
- Mycomya simulans Vaisanen, 1984^{c g}
- Mycomya sororcula (Zetterstedt, 1852)^{c g}
- Mycomya sphagnicola Shaw, 1941^{i c g}
- Mycomya spinicoxa (Vaisanen, 1979)^{c g}
- Mycomya spinifera Freeman, 1951^{c g}
- Mycomya spinosa Freeman, 1951^{c g}
- Mycomya stares Vaisanen, 1984^{i c g}
- Mycomya storai Vaisanen, 1979^{c g}
- Mycomya storåi Vaisanen, 1979^{c g}
- Mycomya strombuliforma Wu & Yang, 1993^{c g}
- Mycomya subarctica Vaisanen, 1979^{i c g}
- Mycomya subepacra Coher, 1959^{c g}
- Mycomya subfusca Freeman, 1951^{c g}
- Mycomya sublittoralis Shaw, 1941^{i c g}
- Mycomya sus Vaisanen, 1996^{c g}
- Mycomya sylvicola (Skuse, 1890)^{c g}
- Mycomya tamerlani Vaisanen, 1984^{c g}
- Mycomya tantalos Coher, 1959^{c g}
- Mycomya tantilla (Loew, 1869)^{i c g}
- Mycomya taurica (Strobl, 1898)^{c g}
- Mycomya taurus Freeman, 1951^{c g}
- Mycomya tenuis (Walker, 1856)^{i c}
- Mycomya terminata Garrett, 1924^{i c g}
- Mycomya theobaldi Coher, 1959^{c g}
- Mycomya thrakis Chandler, 2006^{c g}
- Mycomya thula Vaisanen, 1984^{i c g}
- Mycomya tigrina Vaisanen, 1996^{c g}
- Mycomya tolteca Vaisanen, 1984^{c g}
- Mycomya traveri Coher, 1950^{c g}
- Mycomya triacantha Shaw, 1941^{i c g}
- Mycomya tricamata Wu & Yang, 1996^{c g}
- Mycomya trichops Freeman, 1951^{c g}
- Mycomya tridens (Lundstrom, 1911)^{c g}
- Mycomya trifida (Ostroverkhova, 1979)^{c g}
- Mycomya trilineata (Zetterstedt, 1838)^{c g}
- Mycomya trivittata (Zetterstedt, 1838)^{i c g}
- Mycomya tumida (Winnertz, 1863)^{c g}
- Mycomya tungusica (Ostroverkhova, 1979)^{c g}
- Mycomya turnix Vaisanen, 1996^{c g}
- Mycomya ultima Vaisanen, 1984^{i c g}
- Mycomya unicolor (Walker, 1848)^{i c g}
- Mycomya unipectinata Edwards, 1927^{c g}
- Mycomya univittata (Zetterstedt, 1838)^{c g}
- Mycomya vaisaneni Wu & Yang, 1994^{c g}
- Mycomya vittiventris (Zetterstedt, 1852)^{c g}
- Mycomya viverra Vaisanen, 1996^{c g}
- Mycomya wankowiczii Dzeidzicki^{i c g}
- Mycomya winnertzi (Dziedzicki, 1885)^{i c g}
- Mycomya wirthi Vaisanen, 1984^{i c g}
- Mycomya woodi Vaisanen, 1984^{i c g}
- Mycomya wrzesniowskii (Dziedzicki, 1885)^{c g}
- Mycomya wuorentausi Vaisanen, 1984^{c g}
- Mycomya wuyishana Yang & Wu, 1993^{c g}
- Mycomya yatai ^{g}
- Mycomya yoshimotoi Matile, 1991^{c g}
- Mycomya yunga Vaisanen, 1984^{c g}
- Mycomya zaitsevi Vaisanen, 1984^{c g}
- Mycomya zig Vaisanen, 1996^{c g}

Data sources: i = ITIS, c = Catalogue of Life, g = GBIF, b = Bugguide.net
