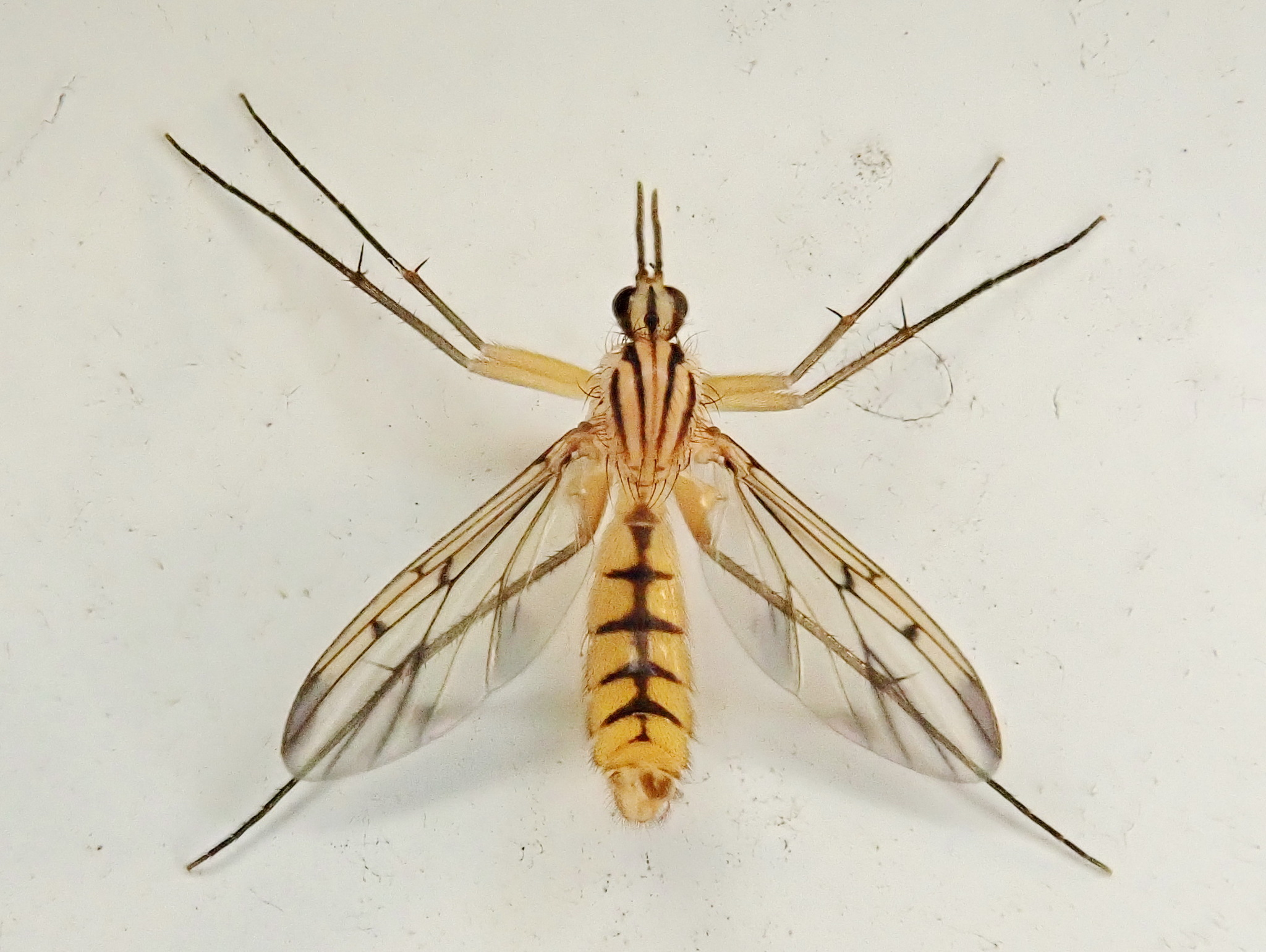

Scientific classification
- Domain: Eukaryota
- Kingdom: Animalia
- Phylum: Arthropoda
- Class: Insecta
- Order: Diptera
- Family: Mycetophilidae
- Subfamily: Mycomyinae
- Genus: Neoempheria
- Species: N. balioptera

Binomial name
- Neoempheria balioptera (Loew, 1869)

Synonyms
- Empheria balioptera Loew, 1869; Neoempheria lutea Tollet, 1948

= Neoempheria balioptera =

Species of fly

Neoempheria balioptera is a species of fungus gnats in the family Mycetophilidae.
