= Mycomya imitans =

Scientific classification
- Domain: Eukaryota
- Kingdom: Animalia
- Phylum: Arthropoda
- Class: Insecta
- Order: Diptera
- Family: Mycetophilidae
- Genus: Mycomya
- Species: M. imitans

Binomial name
- Mycomya imitans Johannsen, 1910

Species of fly

Mycomya imitans is a species of fungus gnats in the family Mycetophilidae.
