= Parempheriella =

Scientific classification
- Kingdom: Animalia
- Phylum: Arthropoda
- Class: Insecta
- Order: Diptera
- Family: Mycetophilidae
- Subfamily: Mycomyinae
- Genus: Parempheriella; Matile 1974

Type species
- Parempheriella lobayensis Matile, 1974

Synonyms
- Vecella Wu & Yang, 1996

Genus of flies

Parempheriella is a genus of fungus gnats in the family Mycetophilidae. It contains 38 Aftrotropical species and 6 Oriental species.

== Species ==
Selected species:

- Parempheriella defectiva Edwards, 1931
- Parempheriella guadunana Wu & Yang, 1996
- Parempheriella lobayensis Matile, 1974
- Parempheriella longyamen Amorim & Oliveira, 2025
- Parempheriella mait Amorim & Oliveira, 2025
- Parempheriella peranakan Amorim & Oliveira, 2025
