= Mycomya dichaeta =

Scientific classification
- Domain: Eukaryota
- Kingdom: Animalia
- Phylum: Arthropoda
- Class: Insecta
- Order: Diptera
- Family: Mycetophilidae
- Genus: Mycomya
- Species: M. dichaeta

Binomial name
- Mycomya dichaeta Fisher, 1937

Species of fly

Mycomya dichaeta is a species of fungus gnats in the family Mycetophilidae.
