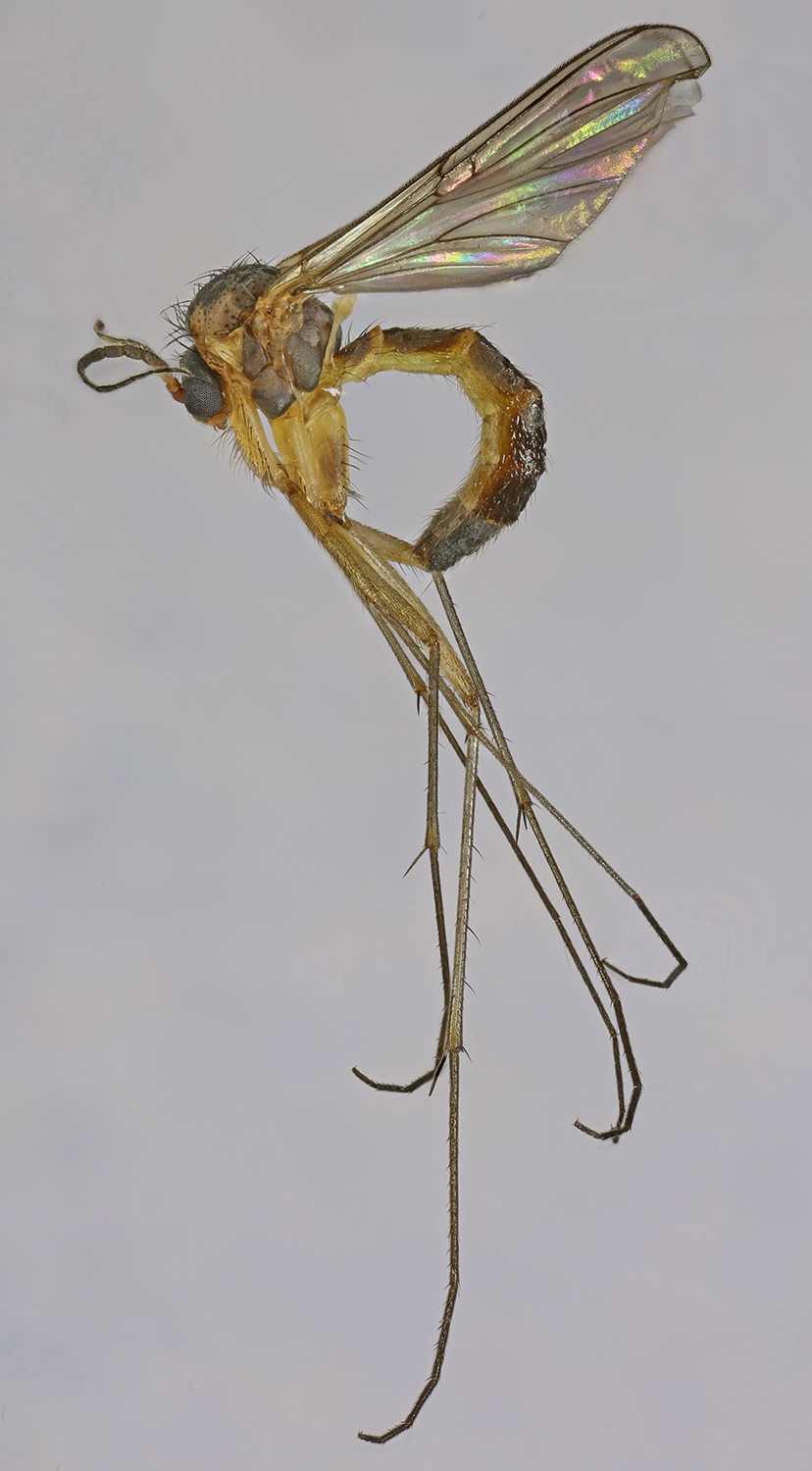
- Mycomya cinerascens North Wales

Scientific classification
- Domain: Eukaryota
- Kingdom: Animalia
- Phylum: Arthropoda
- Class: Insecta
- Order: Diptera
- Family: Mycetophilidae
- Genus: Mycomya
- Species: M. cinerascens

Binomial name
- Mycomya cinerascens (Macquart, 1826)

= Mycomya cinerascens =

Species of fly

Mycomya cinerascens is a Palearctic species of 'fungus gnats' in the family Mycetophilidae. Mycomya cinerascens is found in forest or wooded areas where the larvae develop in fruiting bodies of Stereum, Thelephora terrestris and Cortinarius sp..Besides fruiting bodies the species has been collected with emergence traps over beech logs and stumps, alder and spruce stumps.

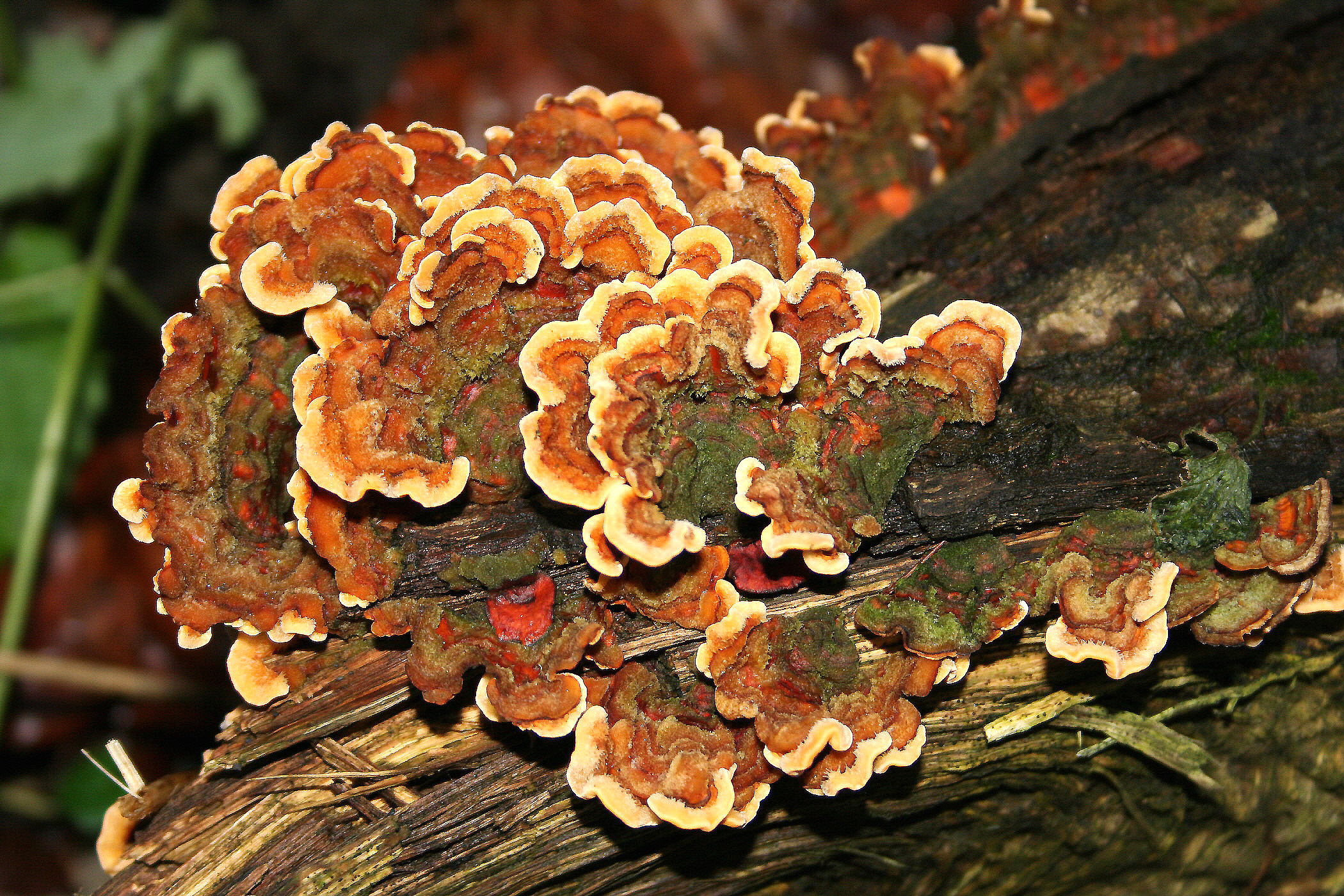
Microhabitat. Belgium
