= Neoempheria macularis =

Scientific classification
- Domain: Eukaryota
- Kingdom: Animalia
- Phylum: Arthropoda
- Class: Insecta
- Order: Diptera
- Family: Mycetophilidae
- Genus: Neoempheria
- Species: N. macularis

Binomial name
- Neoempheria macularis Johannsen, 1910

Species of fly

Neoempheria macularis is a species of fungus gnats in the family Mycetophilidae.
