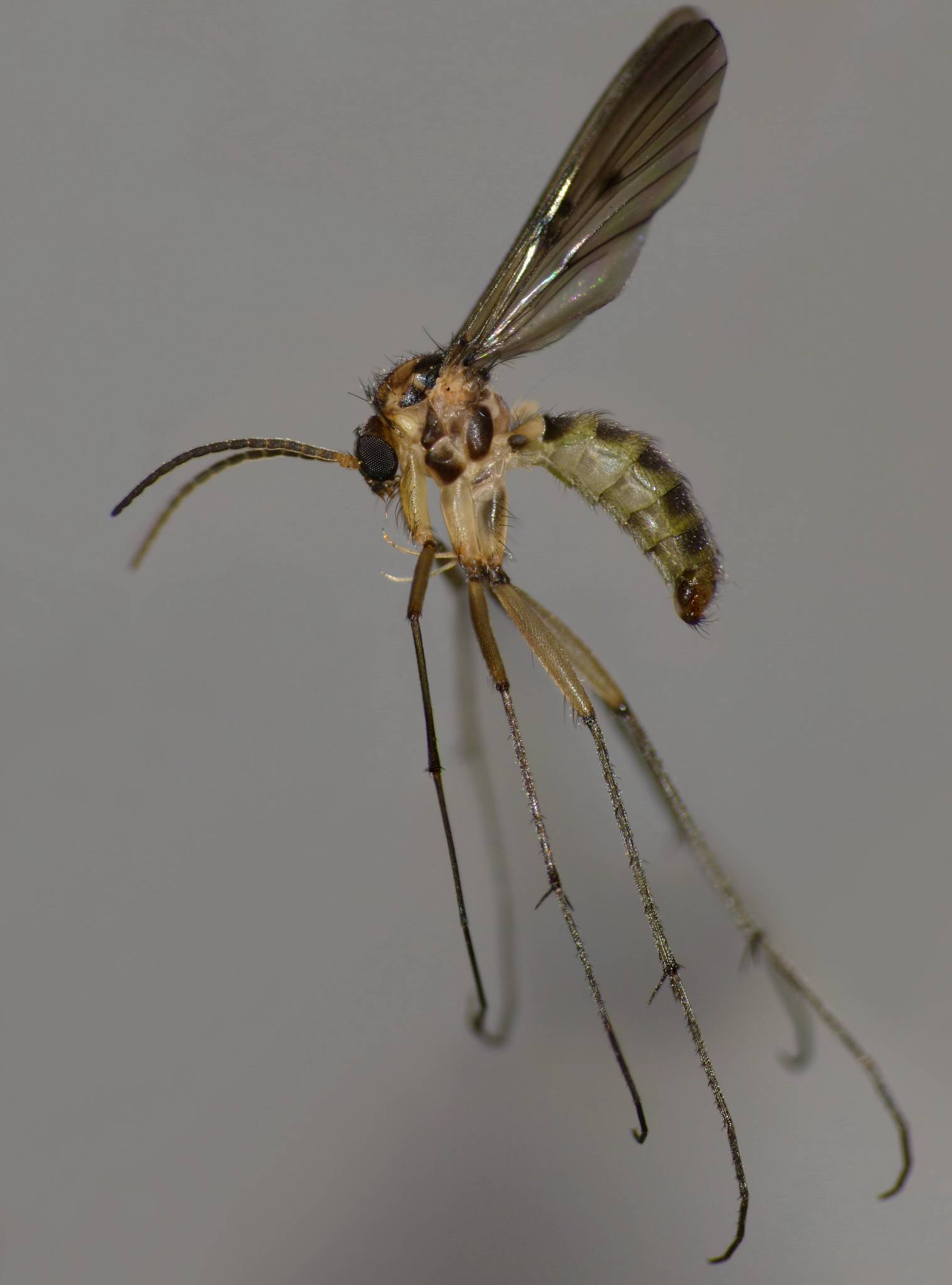
- Mycomya quadrimaculata

Scientific classification
- Kingdom: Animalia
- Phylum: Arthropoda
- Clade: Pancrustacea
- Class: Insecta
- Order: Diptera
- Family: Mycetophilidae
- Subfamily: Mycomyinae; Edwards, 1925

= Mycomyinae =

Subfamily of flies

Mycomyinae is a subfamily of fungus gnats in the family Mycetophilidae. As of 2025, it consists of 10 genera and over 600 species.

== Diagnosis ==
This subfamily can be separated from the other mycetophiloid families and subfamilies based on the following characteristics: The veins of M and Cu fork separate to wing base, fine tibial setae in regular rows, middle ocellus absent, empodia absent, and wing membrane without macrotrichia.

The pupa is immobile with distinctly strengthened integument and pedothecae tightly bound to the body.

== Genera ==
The 10 genera are as follows:

- Dinempheria Matile, 1979
- Echinopodium Freeman, 1951
- Moriniola Matile, 1976
- Mycoleia Väisänen, 1984
- Mycomya Rondani, 1856
- Mycomyiella Matile, 1973
- Neoempheria Osten Sacken, 1878
- Parempheriella Matile 1974
- Syndocosia Speiser, 1923
- Viridivora Matile, 1972

In 2025, the genus Vecella was determined to be a junior synonym of Parempheriella and is therefore not included in the list above.
