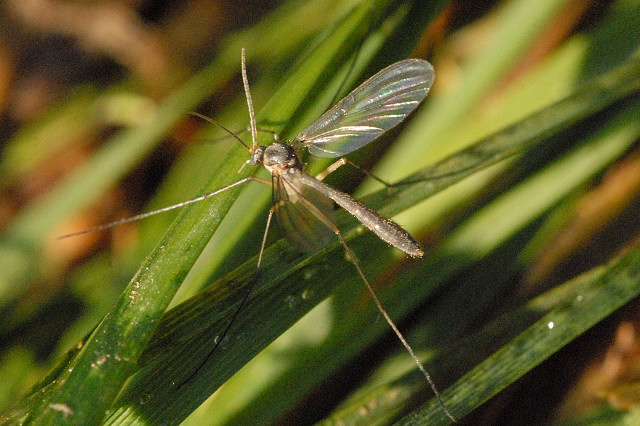
- Neoempheria pictipennis

Scientific classification
- Kingdom: Animalia
- Phylum: Arthropoda
- Class: Insecta
- Order: Diptera
- Family: Mycetophilidae
- Subfamily: Mycomyinae
- Genus: Neoempheria; Osten Sacken, 1878

Diversity
- at least 150 species

= Neoempheria =

Genus of flies

Neoempheria is a genus of fungus gnats in the family Mycetophilidae. There are at least 140 described species in Neoempheria.

== See also ==
- List of Neoempheria species
