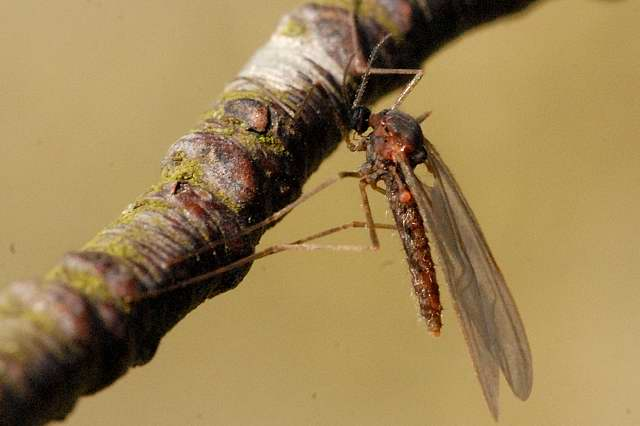
- Mycomya fuscata

Scientific classification
- Domain: Eukaryota
- Kingdom: Animalia
- Phylum: Arthropoda
- Class: Insecta
- Order: Diptera
- Family: Mycetophilidae
- Subfamily: Mycomyinae
- Genus: Mycomya; Rondani, 1856

Diversity
- at least 410 species

= Mycomya =

Genus of flies

Mycomya is a genus of fungus gnats in the family Mycetophilidae. There are at least 400 described species in Mycomya.

== See also ==
- List of Mycomya species
