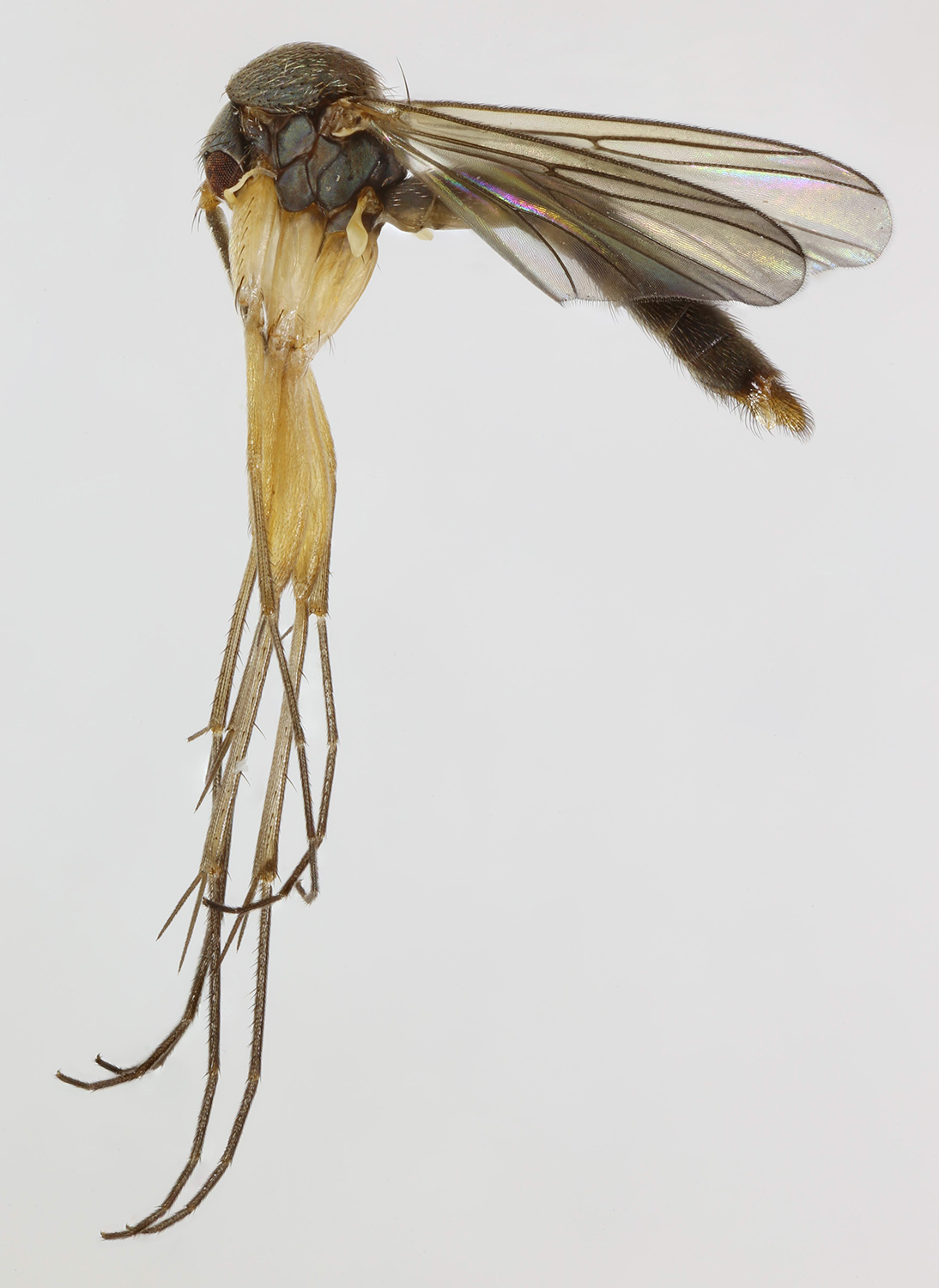
- Brevicornu foliatum North Wales

Scientific classification
- Kingdom: Animalia
- Phylum: Arthropoda
- Class: Insecta
- Order: Diptera
- Family: Mycetophilidae
- Genus: Brevicornu
- Species: B. foliatum

Binomial name
- Brevicornu foliatum (Edwards, 1925)

= Brevicornu foliatum =

Species of fly

Brevicornu foliatum is a Palearctic species of 'fungus gnat' in the family Mycetophilidae. Members of this genus are found in a wider variety of habitats from wooded streams to wetlands and open moorland. Larvae develop in dead wood and in soil litter, feeding probably on microfungi.
